= Borgo (rione of Rome) =

Administrative district of Rome

Coordinates: 41.9041°N 12.4616°E

- Rione of Rome
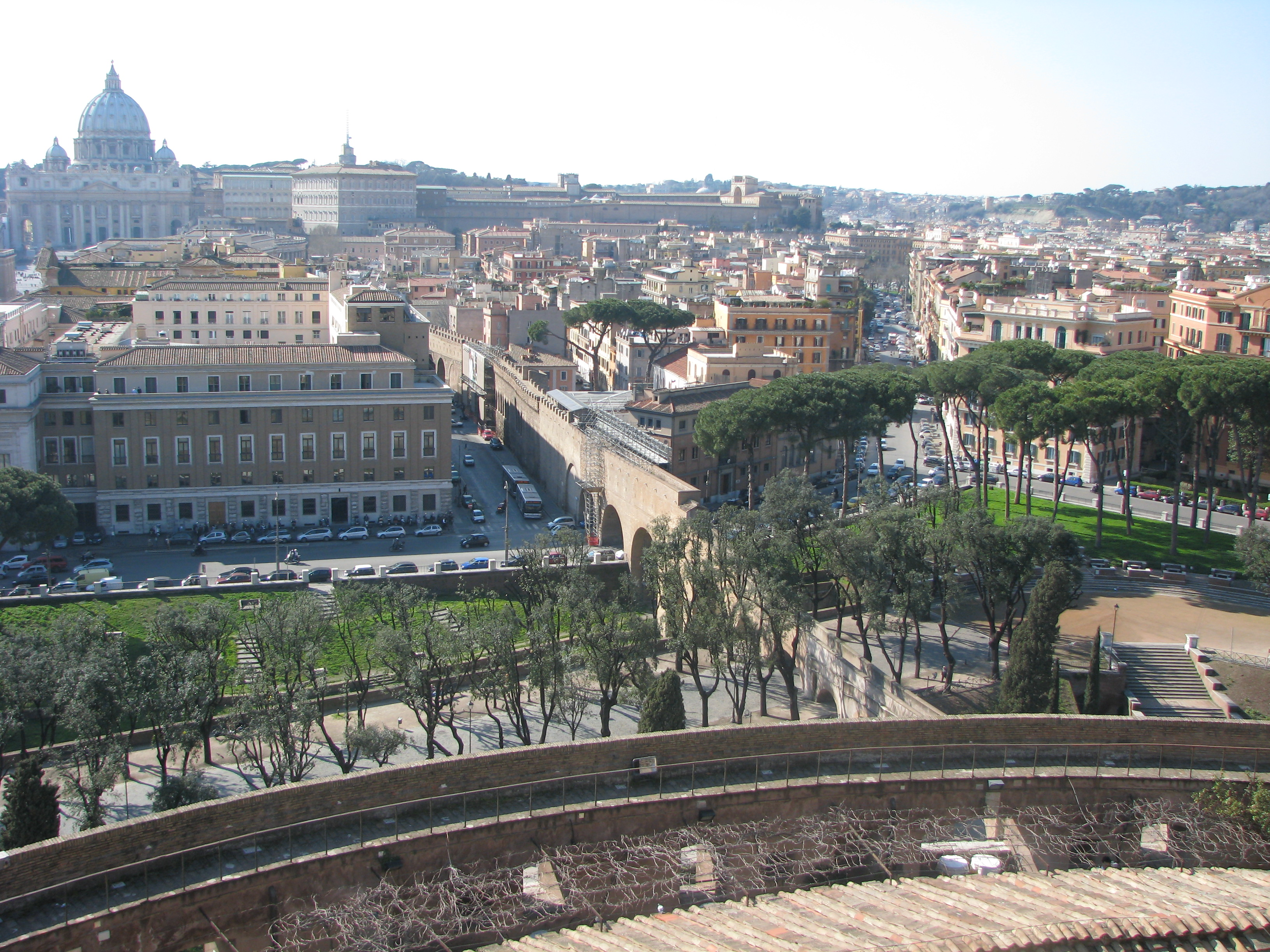
- A view of the central and northern part of the rione with Vatican City in the background, as seen from Castel Sant'Angelo

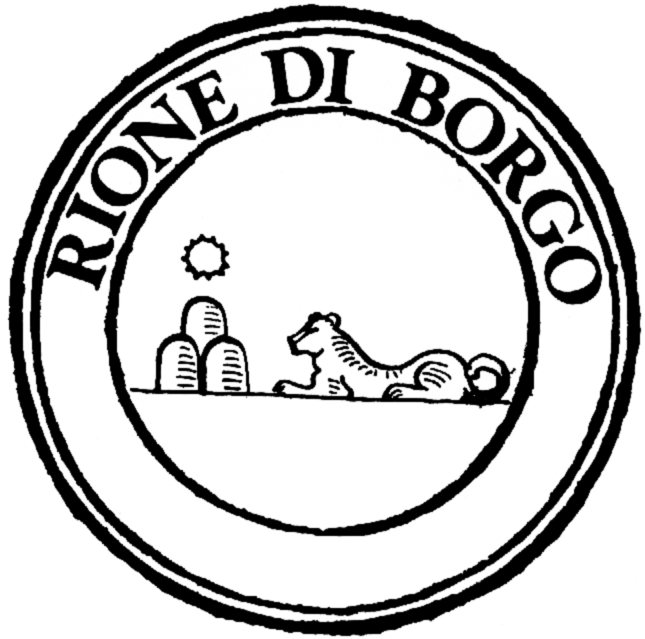
- Seal

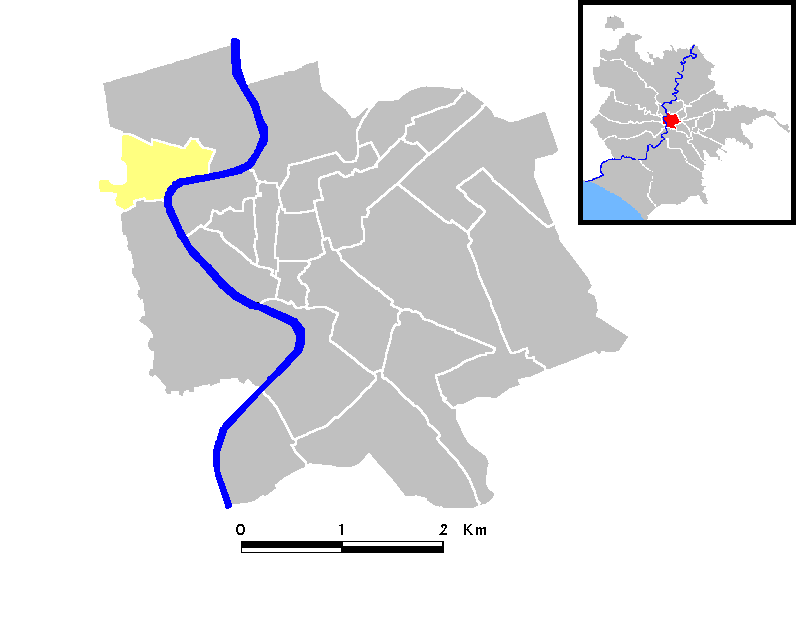
- Position of the rione within the center of the city
- Country: Italy
- Region: Lazio
- Province: Rome
- Comune: Rome
- Demonym: Borghiciani
- Time zone: UTC+1 (CET)
  - Summer (DST): UTC+2 (CEST)

Borgo (sometimes called also I Borghi) is the 14th rione (administrative district) of Rome, Italy. It is identified by the initials R. XIV and is included within Municipio I.

Its coat of arms shows a lion (after the name "Leonine City", which was also given to the district), lying in front of three mounts and a star. These – together with a lion rampant – are also part of the coat of arms of Pope Sixtus V, who annexed Borgo as the 14th rione of Rome.

== History ==
=== Roman Age: Ager Vaticanus ===
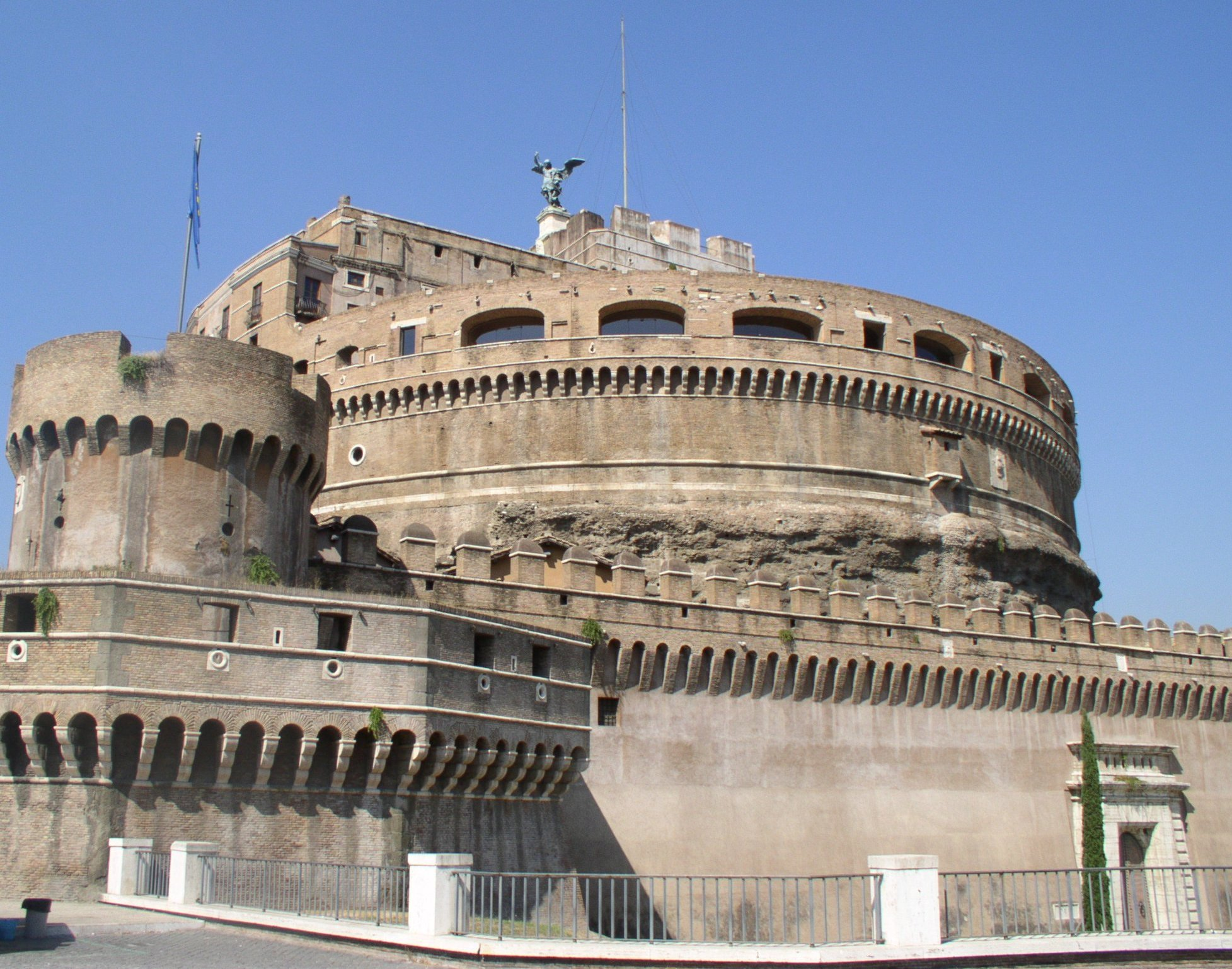
Hadrian's Mausoleum still makes up the core of Castel Sant'Angelo. The tuff blocks visible in the lower part of the cylinder are Roman.

During the Roman age, the Borgo district was part of the 14th Regio (Regio XIV Transtiberim) and was named Ager Vaticanus, after the auguries (vaticinii) performed there by the Etruscan Augurs. Since it lay outside the Pomerium (the religious city border inside which burial was forbidden) and was plagued by malaria, this territory was used as a burial place. Some tombs reached notable proportions, including the Terebinthus Neronis, which was a round tomb surmounted by a narrow tower, and the Meta Romuli, a pyramid similar to that still standing near Porta San Paolo) that was demolished only in 1499.

At the foot of the Vatican Hill, two roads started: the Via Cornelia, which joined the Via Aurelia near Tarquinii, and the Via Triumphalis (Triumphal Road), which met the Via Cassia a few kilometers north. The latter was so named because, beginning with Titus, the Roman Emperors used it to enter the city when celebrating their Triumphs.

At the beginning of the Imperial Age, magnificent Villae (country houses) and Horti (Gardens), such as those owned by Agrippina the Elder, wife of Germanicus and mother of Caligula (Horti Agrippinae), and by Domitia Longina, wife of Domitianus (Horti Domitiae), were built near the slopes of the Gianicolo and Vatican hills.

Emperor Gaius (also known as Caligula) built on the Vatican a circus (Circus Gaianus), which was then enlarged by Nero (Circus Neronis). The obelisk standing today in St. Peter's Square was erected along its raised median (the spina). The circus was connected to the city through an archway (Porticus). Nero also replaced the timber bridge of the Via Triumphalis with a stone bridge, (whose ruins can still be seen in the Tiber during the minimum flow periods) named after him Pons Neronianus or Triumphalis. Emperor Hadrian built near the Tiber his huge Mausoleum, which he connected to the left bank of the river with another Bridge, the Pons Ælius (today's Ponte Sant'Angelo).

But what changed forever the destiny of the zone was the martyrdom of St. Peter at the foot of the Vatican hill in 67, during the first persecution of the Christians. The saint was buried nearby, and this turned the Vatican into a place of pilgrimage. Above the tomb of the saint, Pope Anacletus built an oratory, which in 324 Emperor Constantine turned into a huge basilica devoted to the prince of the Apostles. This church, known today as Old Saint Peter's, soon became (until its destruction in the 16th century, when the new Saint Peter's was erected in its place) one of the centers of Christianity.

=== Middle Ages: Civitas Leonina ===
During the early Middle Ages the bridge of Nero fell into ruins, while the Mausoleum of Hadrian was converted into a stronghold (Castel Sant'Angelo), the possession of which ensured control of the city. Despite the wars and invasions that plagued Rome during those centuries, the flood of pilgrims to the tomb of the apostle never stopped. Pilgrims of the same nationality gathered together in associations named Scholae, whose task was to host and to aid men and women of the same nation coming to Rome. The most famous were those of the Franks, Saxons, Frisians and Lombards. Each Schola had its own hospice and church. One of the first – the Schola Saxonum - was built during the 8th century by Ina or Ine, king of the West Saxons. That hospice became the core of the future Hospital of Santo Spirito, one of the oldest and largest in Rome, founded by Pope Innocent III in 1198. Near the hospital was erected the church of Santo Spirito in Sassia. The German pilgrims gave the zone around their Scholae the name Burg (fortified town), which, italianised, became the name of the quarter.

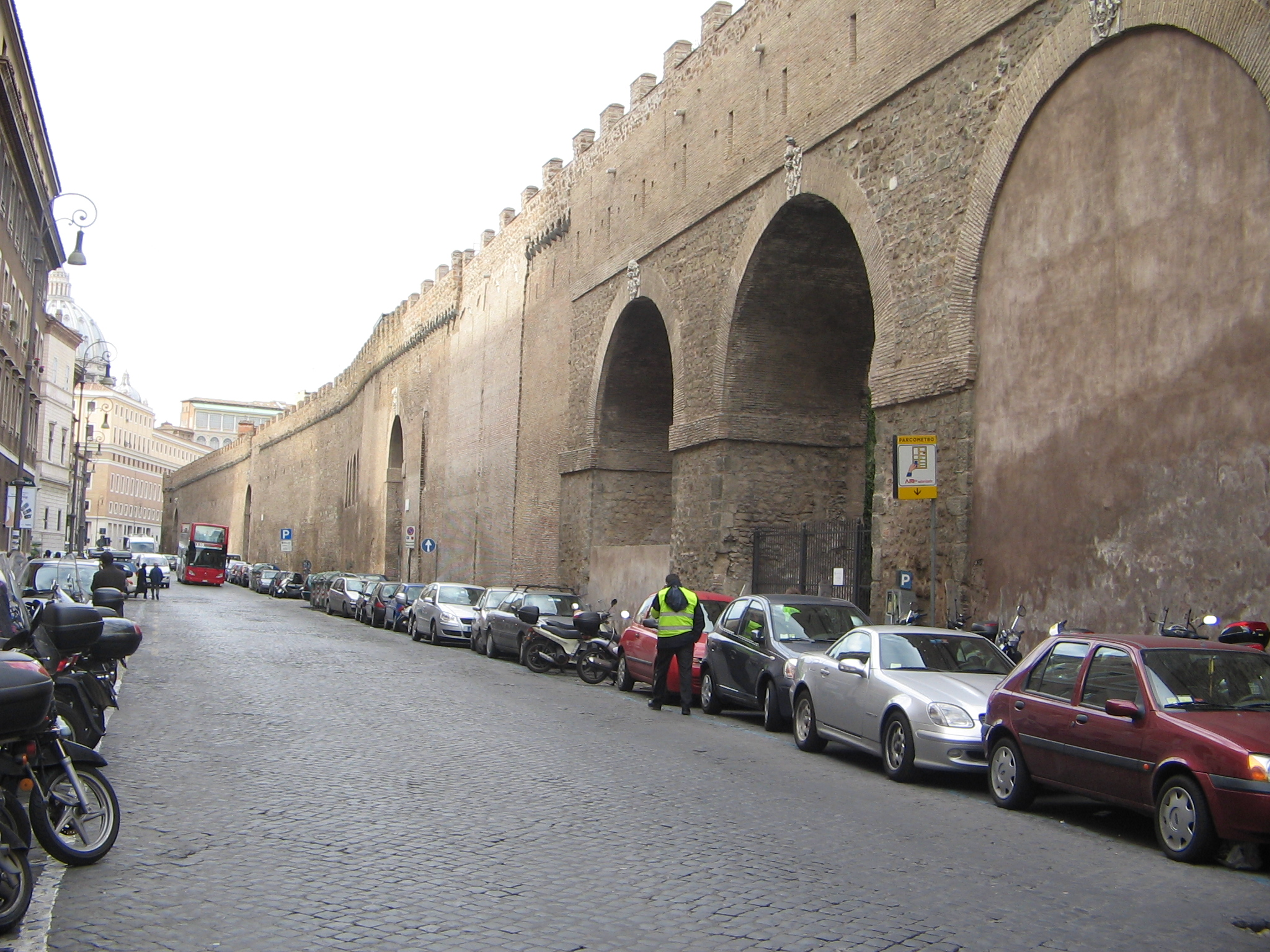
The Passetto, called in Roman dialect er Corridore ("the Corridor"), seen from Borgo S. Angelo: Via dei Corridori (the ancient Borgo dell'Elefante, so named after Hanno the elephant), and Saint Peter's dome are in the background

Since it lay outside Aurelian's Walls, the Borgo was always exposed to attacks. During the 8th and 9th centuries, the quarter – together with the basilica - was plundered several times by Saracens who landed in Portus, and devastated by fires (that of 847 was immortalised by Raphael in a fresco painted in the stanze vaticane).

Finally, Pope Leo IV built the walls which still bear his name. On June 27, 852 the Pope, accompanied by the clergy and people, started this undertaking walking bare-foot along the circuit of the new walls. Then, in order to augment the population, Pope Leo settled several families of Corsicans in the Borgo. Since that time, the quarter was no longer considered a part of Rome, but a separate town, the Leonine City (Civitas Leonina), with its own magistrates and governor. It was only in 1586, under Pope Sixtus V, that the Borgo, as fourteenth rione, became again a part of Rome. The Leonine walls, which incorporated an older wall built by Totila during the Gothic War, still exist between the Vatican and the Castle, where they bear the name of Passetto. This constitutes a covered passage, which could be used – and actually has been used several times - by the Pope as an escape route from his residence to the Castle in case of danger.

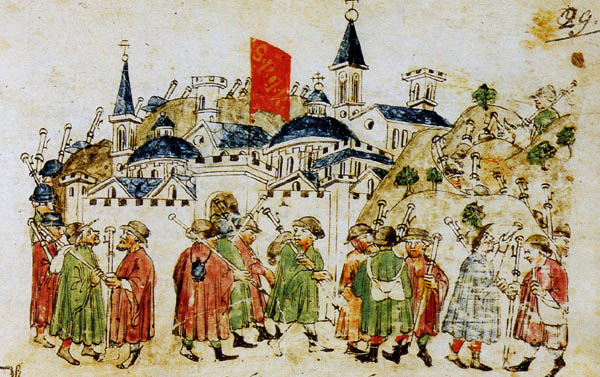
A contemporary miniature portraying pilgrims reaching Rome during the Jubilee of 1300. They are approaching the Leonine City from N (Prati di Castello). The hills in the background are (from right to left) Monte Mario, Vatican and Gianicolo.

In the Middle Ages, the quarter was not much populated, with sparse houses, some churches and a lot of vegetable gardens. There were also several brick furnaces, using the clay abundant in the Vatican and Gianicolo hills. A small harbor, the Porto Leonino, later used to deliver the travertine blocks needed to build the new Saint Peter's, existed south of the castle.

The pilgrims going to St. Peter's and coming from the left bank through Ponte Sant'Angelo, after entering a gate (later named Porta Castello) could walk through the Borgo of the Saxons (today's Borgo Santo Spirito) or the Porticus or Portica (named now Porticus Sancti Petri), which was still in place. Those coming from Trastevere along the route that would later become Via della Lungara used the posterula Saxonum (today's Porta Santo Spirito), and, finally, the pilgrims coming from the north (monte Mario) following the Via Francigena, entered through Porta San Pellegrino (also named Viridaria because of its vicinity to the Vatican Gardens).

In his Divine Comedy, Dante describes the great crowds of pilgrims visiting the Leonine City during the first Jubilee, which took place in 1300 under Boniface VIII.

come i Roman per l’essercito molto,
l’anno del giubileo, su per lo ponte
hanno a passar la gente modo colto,

che da l’un lato tutti hanno la fronte
verso ’l castello e vanno a Santo Pietro,
da l’altra sponda vanno verso ’l monte.

as, in the year of Jubilee, the Romans,
confronted by great crowds, contrived a plan
that let the people pass across the bridge,

for to one side went all who had their eyes
upon the Castle, heading toward St. Peter’s,
and to the other, those who faced the Mount.

During the Avignon Papacy the Borgo, together with Rome, suffered decay. The Portica collapsed, and on its place was built the road of Borgo Vecchio, also named Carriera Martyrum after the martyrs going to death in the Circus of Nero. During that time only Borgo Santo Spirito and Borgo Vecchio afforded access to reach Saint Peter's from the left bank.

=== Renaissance Age ===
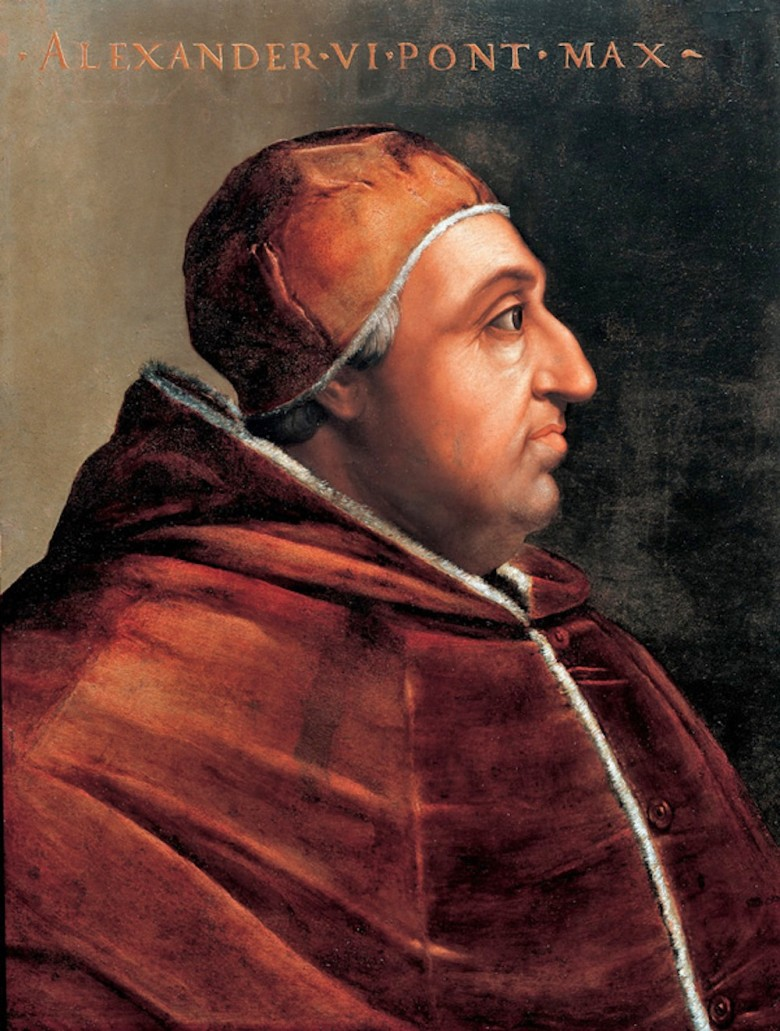
Pope Alexander VI played an important role in Borgo's town planning. The most famous among his children, Cesare Borgia, lived in the Leonine City.

The recovery began with the end of the Western Schism and the beginning of the Renaissance. By that time, the center of gravity of Rome began to shift from the zone around Campidoglio, where medieval Rome had developed, to the Campo Marzio plain. At the same time, the Popes abandoned finally the Lateran complex for the Vatican, which now became the new center of power in Rome. The large amount of building activity and above all the rebuilding of Saint Peter, which was the ultimate result of this translocation, attracted several artists to the Borgo, while the renewed flood of pilgrims boosted commerce.

Under Nicholas V, Bernardo Rossellino planned three diverging roads with arcades going to Saint Peter, but the Pontiff's death blocked the project. Sixtus IV opened a new road parallel to the Passetto, named after him via Sistina (later Borgo Sant'Angelo).

Magnificent buildings were built at the beginning of the 16th century by high prelates and aristocrats, including Palazzo Branconio dell'Aquila, designed by Raphael; the Palazzo Caprini by Donato Bramante (a house that Raphael chose to buy, and later became part of the Palazzo dei Convertendi); Palazzo Castellesi, built by Cardinal Adriano Castellesi, attributed to Andrea Bregno or Bramante and a small-scale copy of the Palazzo della Cancelleria, and Palazzo dei Penitenzieri, perhaps designed by of Baccio Pontelli. The last three palaces faced a small square, Piazza del Cardinale di S. Clemente (later Piazza Scossacavalli), which became the most important in the Borgo.

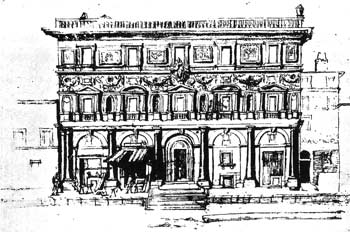
Drawing of Palazzo Branconio dell'Aquila, demolished in the 17th century to open the new piazza Rusticucci, so called after the eponymous palace

Also wealthy bourgeoises, such as Febo Brigotti and Jacopo da Brescia, the doctors respectively of Paul III and Leo X, had their houses built in the Borgo.

The Leonine City at that time was also renowned in Rome for its stufe. These buildings, whose tradition came from Germany (the name comes from the German word stube), were something between a Roman bath and a modern sauna, and were often attended by artists, who could freely sketch nudes there (Raffaello himself was owner of a stufa in Borgo, near his palace).

==== Golden age and creation of the spina ====
In order to address the traffic problems in the bustling Borgo, a new road, the Via Alexandrina or Recta, later named Borgo Nuovo, was opened during the Jubilee of 1500 by Pope Alexander VI Borgia was opened between Castel Sant'Angelo and Saint Peter's Square. The Borgo Nuovo paralleled to the north the existing road of Borgo Vecchio, creating a distinct row of houses between these two roads formed the so-called "spina" (named thus on account of its similarity to the dividing line of an ancient Roman Circus). At about its middle, the spina was interrupted by a small square, called Piazza Scossacavalli. A recurrent theme of Roman city planning, were the various projects contemplating the demolition of the spina: starting with, that of Carlo Fontana in the late 17th century; and ending, in 1936, when, under Benito Mussolini and Pius XI, this task was finally accomplished to create the wide Via della Conciliazione in the space between the form Borgo Nouvo and Borgo Vecchio.

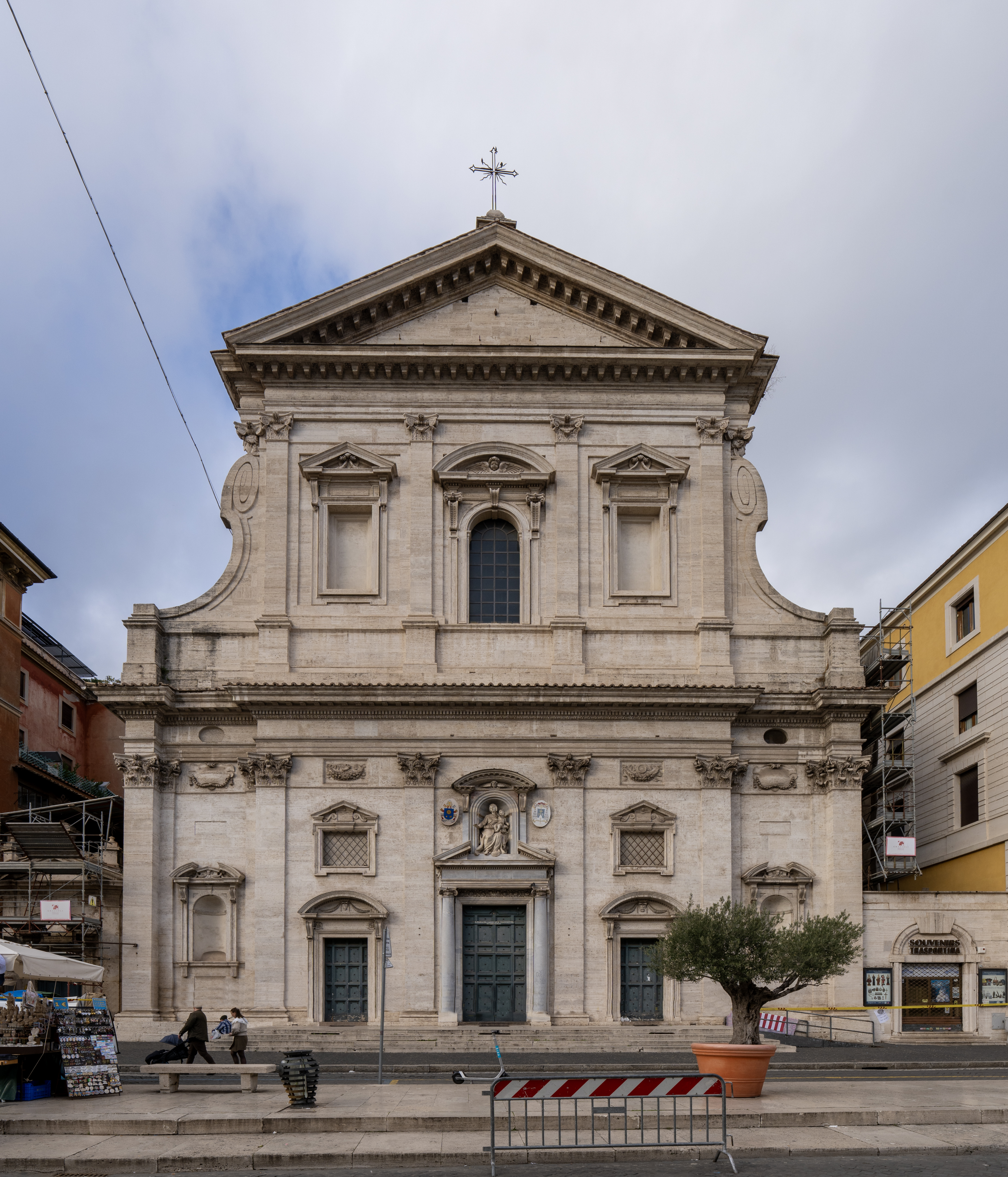
Santa Maria in Traspontina, the work of G.S. Peruzzi, is the only church in Rome whose dome has no drum. The lower height allowed the Castle's gunners (who owned a chapel there) to practise their shooting skills on the Gianicolo.

The golden Age of the Borgo reached its apogee during the reign of the two Florentine Popes, Leo X and Clement VII, both members of the Medici family. Under the latter, the quarter had a population of 4,926 inhabitants, almost all bachelors and non-Roman. Nine out of the twenty five Cardinals belonging to the Curia, each of whom maintained a court comprising hundreds of people, were living here. The most important artists (such as Raphael) took or built their houses in the Borgo. The only important female presence was that of the so-called Cortigiane, decent prostitutes, who were the lovers of high prelates and noblemen.

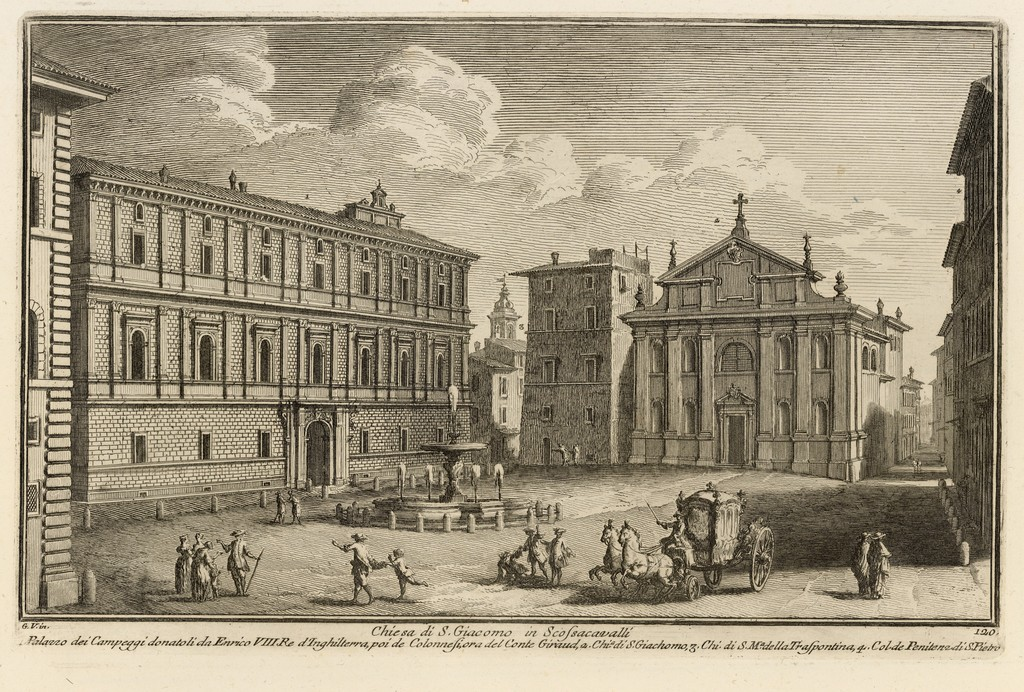
Piazza Scossacavalli (destroyed in 1937) shown in an XVIII engraving by Giuseppe Vasi. In the background are shown the church of San Giacomo and on the left side Palazzo Giraud. In the middle stands the fountain of Carlo Maderno, now re-erected in front of Sant'Andrea della Valle, in Sant'Eustachio.

All this came to an abrupt end on May 6, 1527, when the soldiers of Charles V entered the Leonine City and mercilessly plundered it, so starting the Sack of Rome. Clement VII barely escaped capture, running through the elevated Passetto (one block north of the spina) in his night dress and locking himself within Castel Sant'Angelo, while all the Swiss Guards, except those defending his escape, were killed near the obelisk.

Despite this disaster, the quarter was able to recover quite quickly. Paul III restored the walls, erecting three new ramparts and the still unfinished Porta Santo Spirito (the work of Antonio da Sangallo the younger). The Borgo continued to grow to such an extent, that in 1565 Pius IV started the construction of three new roads, all north of the Passetto, named respectively Borgo Pio (after himself), Borgo Vittorio (after the victory of Lepanto) and Borgo Angelico (after Angelo, his own first name prior to his election). In order to boost the new settlement, he gave tax privileges to the Romans who choose to build their houses here. New Walls, and a new monumental gate (Porta Angelica), were built to protect the new area, which in honor of the Pope was named Civitas Pia. Pius IV also demolished several old churches and monasteries: among these, in 1564, the old Church of Santa Maria in Traspontina, which lay directly next to the Castle. A new church bearing the same name was built in 1587 in the middle of Borgo Nuovo.

=== XIV Rione of Rome ===
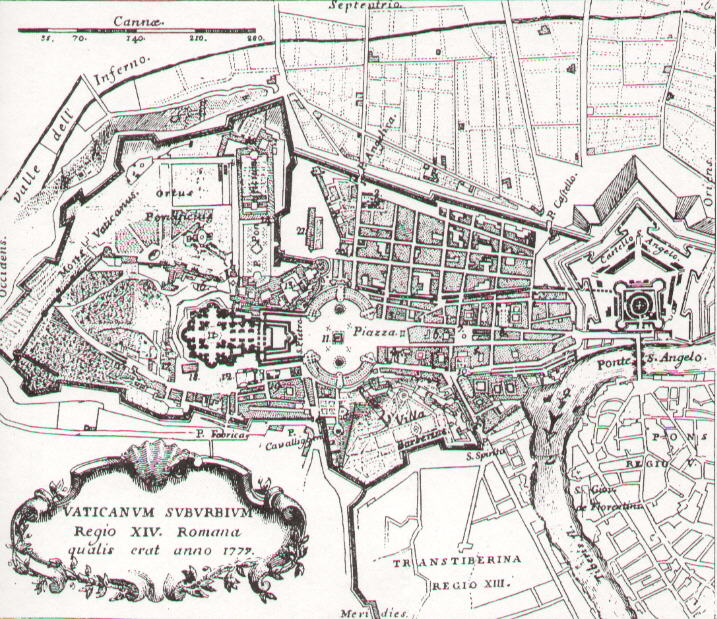
Borgo in 1779 (Map printed by Monaldini). The seven roads that radiate from the Castle are, from N to S: Borgo Angelico, Borgo Vittorio, Borgo Pio, Borgo Sant'Angelo, Borgo Nuovo, Borgo Vecchio, and Borgo Santo Spirito.

On December 9, 1586 (the year when Domenico Fontana erected in Saint Peter's Square the obelisk once standing in the Circus of Nero), Pope Sixtus V declared Borgo the fourteenth Rione of the city. Its coat of arms represents a Lion (representing the Leonine City), and three Mounts and a Star (taken from the coat of arms of Pope Sixtus).

At the beginning of the 17th century Pope Paul V restored the Aqua Traiana, an ancient Roman Aqueduct, and had several fountains built in the Rione (among them, that designed by Carlo Maderno in Piazza Scossacavalli, now placed in front of the church of Sant'Andrea della Valle).

Pope Alexander VII, after the completion of the colonnade designed by Gian Lorenzo Bernini (built between 1656 and 1665), ordered the demolition of the first block in front of it. He created so the Piazza Rusticucci, the vestibule to Saint Peter's Square. Among the other buildings, which then went lost, there was Palazzo Branconio.

During the 18th and the early 19th centuries, the Borgo kept its characteristics. The bourgeoises abandoned the rione for the new settlements in Campo Marzio, and Borgo became a quarter inhabited by simple people (artisans or workers at the Vatican), very devoted yet always open to new ideas, and men of the church, who appreciated the vicinity to the Holy See.

Many sellers of religious goods, named Paternostrari or Coronari (rosary makers) had their shops here. At the edge of the quarter, in Vicolo degli ombrellari, a small lane near Borgo Pio, were the shops of the Roman umbrella makers, gathered there because of the bad smell coming from the oiled silk. In Borgo Vecchio several small foundries were active, where artistic objects made of bronze were cast. Particularly characteristic was the making of bells: the last foundry, located in Vicolo del Farinone, closed around 1995, after an activity lasted about 450 years. In the Borgo were also located many famous osterie, where Romans and pilgrims could eat and drink wine.

Another profession peculiar to the men of the Borgo was that of headsman ("boia"). In fact, the executioner was forbidden to live on the left bank, and even to go there (Boia non passa Ponte, in English: "the headsman cannot cross the bridge", was a Roman proverb), but had to stay in the Leonine City.

The most important yearly event for the rione was the spectacular procession of Corpus Domini, which started and finished in Saint Peter's, and was led by the Pope himself together with the Cardinal Dean, during which each building was dressed with flags and standards.

Things began to change again for the Borgo during the French occupation under Napoleon. The Préfet of Rome, Camille de Tournon, started the demolition of the spina, but the project had to be interrupted shortly after it began due to a lack of funds.

During the Italian Risorgimento the Borgo, together with Trastevere and Monti, was one of the quarters of Rome where public opinion supported with great enthusiasm the struggle for Italian independence. When, shortly after the September 20, 1870 the Italians offered the Pope full sovereignty over the Leonine City with all its inhabitants, this caused violent demonstrations in the Borgo. This offer was refused by Pius IX, who preferred to declare himself a prisoner of the Italian State and seclude himself in the Vatican complex.

After 1870, the walls of Pius IV, which bordered the Rione to the north, were pulled down, together with the Porta Angelica, to ease communication with the new Rione of Prati. Between 1886 and 1911 a new bridge, Ponte Vittorio Emanuele II, located slightly north of the ruins of Nero's Bridge, connected the new avenue of Corso Vittorio Emanuele with Borgo.

=== 1936-1950: the destruction of the Spina ===
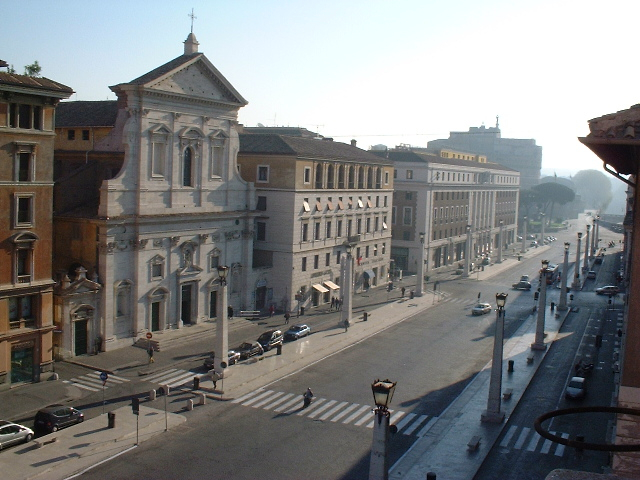
Via della Conciliazione at dawn with Castel Sant'Angelo in morning haze. The picture was taken from the Palazzo dei Penitenzieri, so named after the priests who were in charge of confessing the foreign pilgrims in Saint Peter, and offered Absolution touching them with a rod. They acquired the palace in 1655.

This situation changed forever in 1936 when Mussolini and Pius XI approved a plan by the Roman architects Marcello Piacentini and Attilio Spaccarelli to demolish the spina, a neighborhood sandwiched between the Renaissance-era roads Borgo Nuovo and Borgo Vecchio that linked Saint Peter's to Castel Sant'Angelo. An agreement between the two leaders was possible because of the new climate of collaboration between the State and the Church following the signing of the Lateran Treaties in 1929. On October 23, 1936 (the day after the anniversary of the March on Rome), Mussolini, standing on a roof, gave the first stroke of the pickaxe. By October 8, 1937, the spina ceased to exist, and Saint Peter was freely visible from Castel Sant'Angelo. In the space between the two ancient roads, a new road celebrating the reconciliation (La Conciliazione) of the pope and the Italian State was built, the Via della Conciliazione.

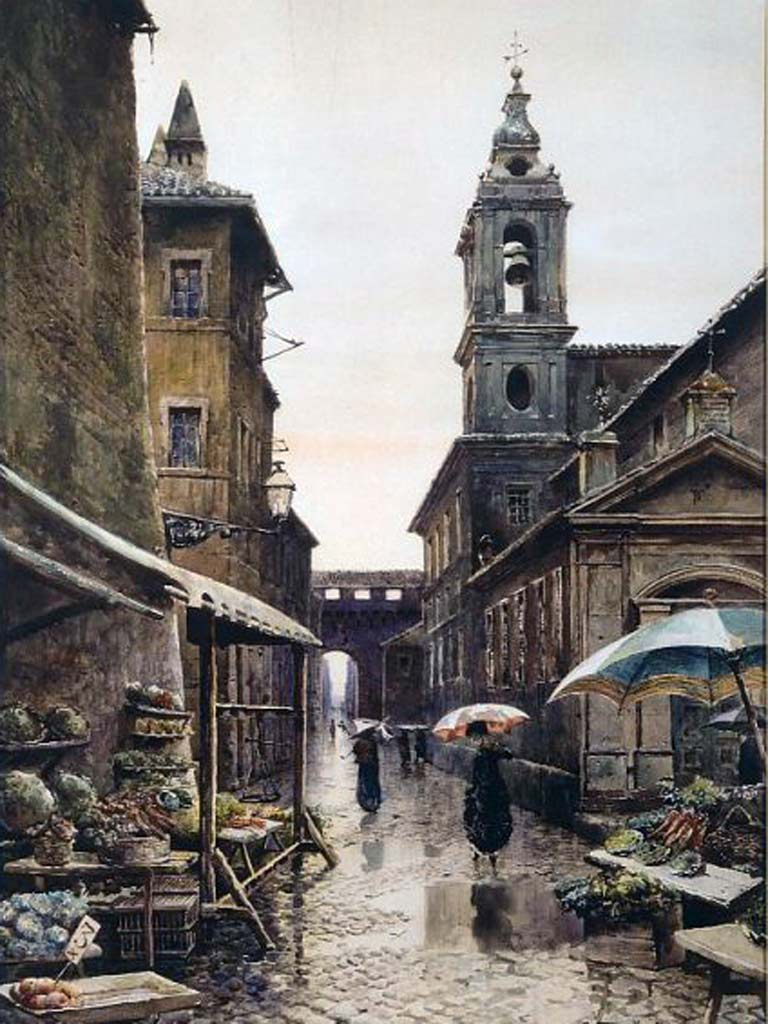
Vicolo del Campanile di Borgo in a watercolour by Ettore Roesler Franz (about 1880). The house on the left in foreground belongs to the spina. The bell tower of Santa Maria in Traspontina, located across the Borgo Nouvo is visible to the right of the lane.

Due to World War II, the work was interrupted. After the war, although the political and cultural climate had changed, the government and the Vatican decided to finish the project. Two Propylaea were built in front of Saint Peter's Square (inside that on the south side was enclosed the ancient church of San Lorenzo in piscibus), and two others at the beginning of the road. The road was finished in time for the Jubilee of 1950, by putting along it two rows of obelisks (which the Romans quickly christened "the suppositories").

The result was that almost all the houses of the Rione south of the Passetto were demolished, with mostly new construction lining the Via della Conciliazione. A few major buildings including Santa Maria in Traspontina (the parish church of Borgo), Palazzo Torlonia, and Palazzo dei Penitenzieri were spared because they were more or less on axis with the new road.

All the others were either pulled down and rebuilt with their fronts on the new roads (like Palazzo dei Convertendi, rebuilt to align with the Via della Conciliazione, and the houses of Febo Brigotti and Jacopo da Brescia, whose façades were reassembled on the new Via dei Corridori), or, like the small churches of San Giacomo a Scossacavalli and Sant'Angelo ai Corridori, formerly built along the Piazza Scossacavalli and along the Passetto, simply demolished and never rebuilt.

Besides a few drawings, no scientific documentation of the old quarter was taken. Most of the inhabitants, whose families had been living and working in Borgo for centuries, were moved to the outskirts in the middle of the Campagna, as Acilia. That happened because no new apartment houses were built, but only offices, mainly used by the Vatican.

Judgement about the whole undertaking, controversial since the beginning, appears now to be largely negative. In fact, besides the destruction of many ancient edifices and, above all, of a whole social tissue, what was lost forever was the "surprise" (typical of the Baroque), when, at the very end of the narrow and dark lanes of the Borgo, the huge Piazza and Basilica suddenly appeared. Now, instead, Saint Peter's appears in the distance, flattened as in a postcard, and the sense of perspective gets lost as well.

During the 1930s extensive demolition affected also the northwestern part of the rione (Via di Porta Angelica e Via del Mascherino). These were officially undertaken in order to better define the border between Italy and the new Vatican State.

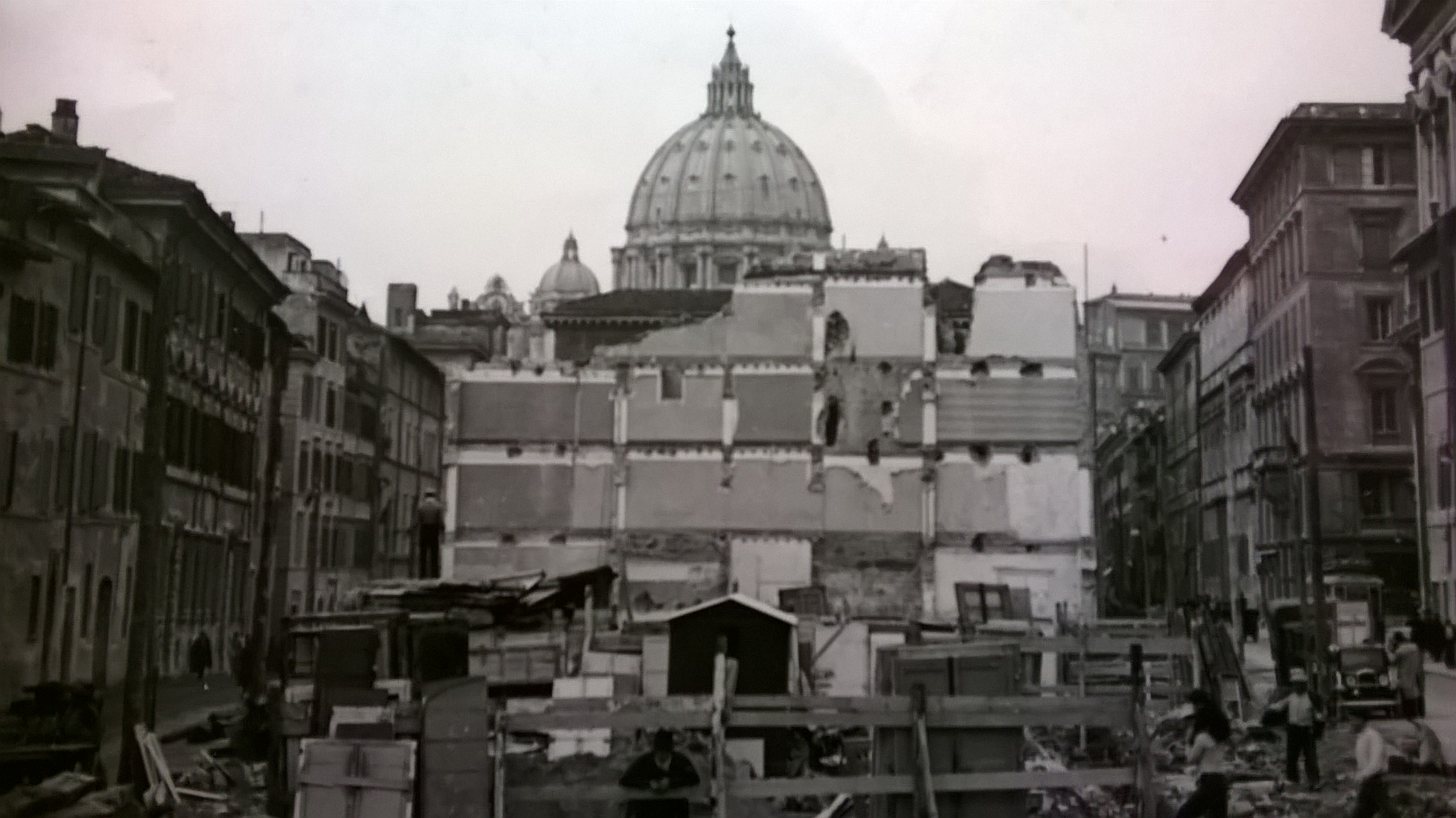
Demolition of the Spina di Borgo at Piazza Scossacavalli (1937)

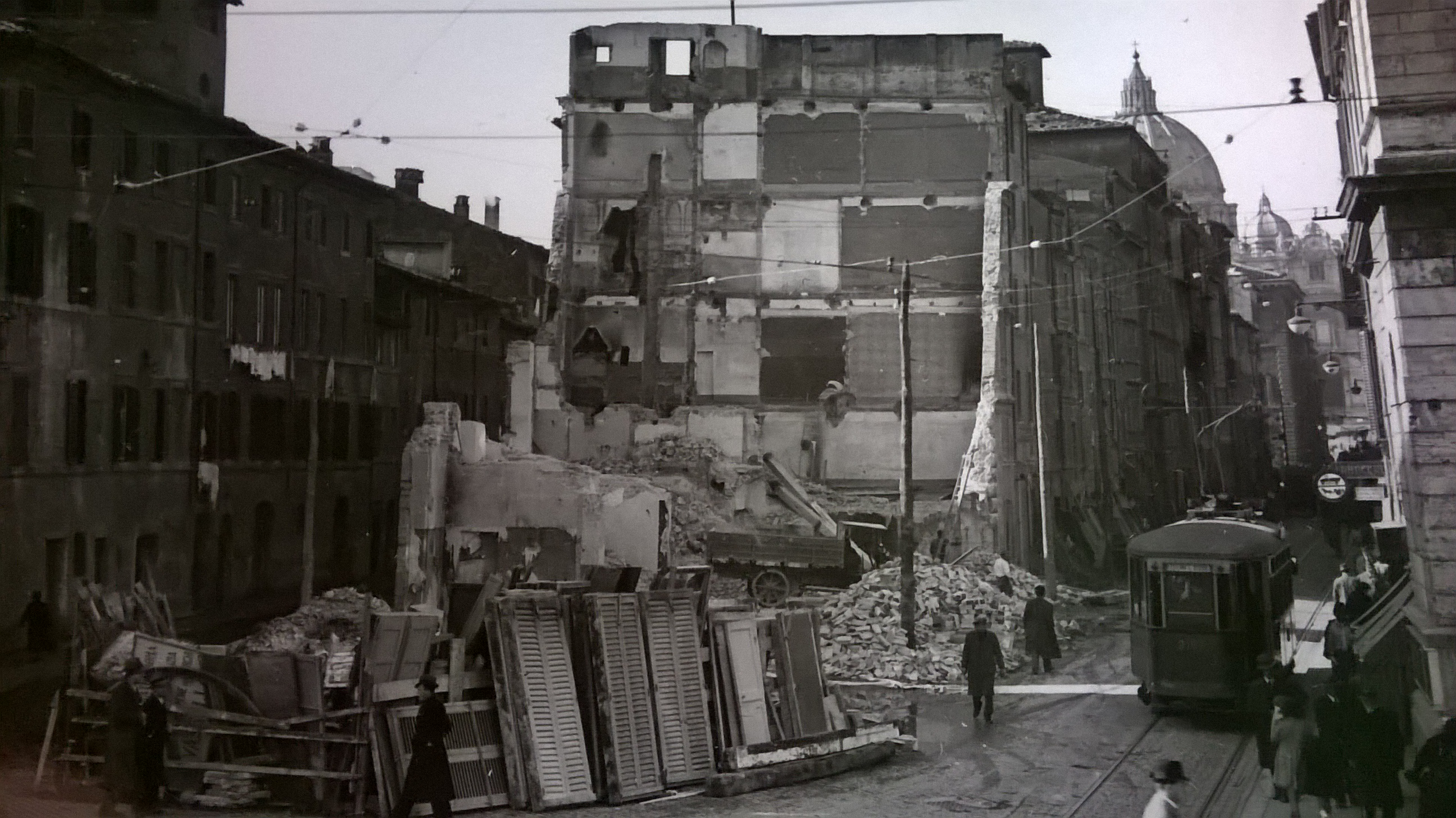
The first stretch of the Spina di Borgo during its demolition (1937)

=== Today ===
Since 1950, the remaining Borghiciani (the name by which the inhabitants of the Borgo are called in Roman dialect), live north of the Passetto, where the quarter retained until recent times its character. Several high prelates live or lived there: among them, late Pope Benedict XVI, who had been living in Borgo Pio for more than twenty years before his election to the Papacy.

South of the Passetto the quarter houses only some offices (mainly belonging to the Vatican), an Auditorium, and the huge complex of the Hospital of Santo Spirito.

== Geography ==
Borgo lies on the west bank of the Tiber and has a trapezoidal shape. The territory of the rione includes a level part, which is made up of the Tiber's alluvial deposits, and a hilly zone, which coincides with the clay-laden slopes of the Vatican hill.

In administrative terms, the rione became part of the city center (the Municipio I) following city decree n.11 issued on 11 March 2013. Before then, it was part of the now abolished Municipio XVII, together with rione of Prati (also merged to the I Municipio in March 2013) and the quartieri Trionfale and Della Vittoria.

=== Boundaries ===
Northward, Borgo borders with Prati (R. XXII), from which is separated by Piazza Adriana, Via Alberico II, Via Properzio, Piazza Americo Capponi, Via Stefano Porcari and Piazza del Risorgimento

Borgo shares with the Vatican City a western border, which is marked by the Vatican wall between Piazza del Risorgimento and Via di Porta Cavalleggeri. Westward, the rione also borders with Quartiere Aurelio (Q. XIII), from which is separated by the stretch of the Leonine Walls beside Via di Porta Cavalleggeri, Largo di Porta Cavalleggeri and Viale delle Mura Aurelie.

Southward, Borgo borders with Trastevere (R. XIII), the boundary being outlined by the Aurelian Walls, up to Ponte Principe Amedeo Savoia Aosta.

To the east, the rione borders with Ponte (R. V), from which is separated by the stretch of the Tiber between Ponte Principe Amedeo Savoia Aosta and Ponte Sant'Angelo.

=== Local geography ===
The main roads run east–west and are named Borghi rather than Vie (the noteworthy exception being the modern Via della Conciliazione).

Although heavily transformed during the first half of the 20th century, Borgo maintains its historical importance as a forecourt to Saint Peter's Basilica and the Vatican Palace.

== Places of interest ==
=== Squares ===
- Piazza Adriana
- Piazza A.Capponi
- Piazza del Catalone
- Piazza della Città Leonina
- Piazza Della Rovere
- Piazza Pia (destroyed in 1937)
- Piazza Pio XII
- Piazza del Risorgimento
- Piazza Rusticucci (destroyed in 1937)
- Piazza Scossacavalli (destroyed in 1937)
- Piazza del S.Uffizio
- Piazza delle Vaschette

=== Roads ===
- Via Alberico II
- Borgo Angelico
- Borgo Nuovo (destroyed in 1937)
- Borgo Pio
- Borgo Sant'Angelo
- Borgo Santo Spirito
- Borgo Vecchio (destroyed in 1937)
- Borgo Vittorio
- Via dei Bastioni
- Vicolo del Campanile
- Lungotevere Castello
- Via dei Cavalieri del Santo Sepolcro
- Viale G.Ceccarelli Ceccarius
- Via della Conciliazione
- Via dei Corridori
- Via dell'Erba
- Via del Falco
- Vicolo del Farinone
- Via delle Fosse di Castello
- Via delle Grazie
- Vicolo dell'Inferriata
- Via del Mascherino
- Via degli Ombrellari
- Vicolo d'Orfeo
- Via dell'Ospedale
- Via Padre P.Pfeiffer
- Vicolo delle Palline
- Via Paolo VI
- Via dei Penitenzieri
- Borgo Pio
- Via Plauto
- Via S.Porcari
- Via di Porta Angelica
- Via di Porta Castello
- Via di Porta Santo Spirito
- Galleria Principe Amedeo di Savoia
- Via Rusticucci
- Borgo Sant'Angelo
- Salita dei Santi Michele e Magno
- Via San Pio X
- Borgo Santo Spirito
- Lungotevere in Sassia
- Via Scossacavalli
- Via della Traspontina
- Via dei Tre Pupazzi
- Lungotevere Vaticano
- Via G.Vitelleschi
- cBorgo Vittorio

=== Buildings ===
- Castel Sant'Angelo
- Ospedale di Santo Spirito in Sassia
- Ospedale di San Carlo (destroyed)
- Palazzo Torlonia
- Palazzo dei Penitenzieri
- Palazzo Caprini (destroyed)
- Palazzo dei Convertendi (destroyed and rebuilt)
- Palazzo Branconio dell'Aquila (destroyed)
- Palazzo Cesi-Armellini
- Palazzo Cesi (destroyed)
- Palazzo del Sant'Uffizio
- Palazzo Rusticucci-Accoramboni (destroyed and rebuilt)
- Palazzo Alicorni (destroyed and rebuilt)
- Palazzo Serristori
- Palazzo del Commendatore
- Palazzo delle Prigioni di Borgo (destroyed, elements reused)
- Palazzo Jacopo da Brescia (destroyed and rebuilt)
- House of Febo Brigotti (destroyed and rebuilt)
- House of the physician of Paul III (destroyed)

=== Churches ===
- Santa Maria in Traspontina
- Santo Spirito in Sassia
- San Lorenzo in Piscibus
- Santa Monica degli Agostiniani
- Santi Michele e Magno
- Santa Maria Annunziata in Borgo
- San Giacomo Scossacavalli (destroyed in 1937)
- Santa Maria delle Grazie a Porta Angelica (destroyed)
- Santa Maria della Purità (demolished between 1937 and 1940)
- San Michele Arcangelo ai Corridori di Borgo (destroyed in 1939)

=== Gates ===
- Porta Castello
- Porta Santo Spirito
- Porta Angelica (destroyed in 1888)

=== Bridges ===
- Ponte Sant'Angelo
- Ponte Vittorio Emanuele II
- Ponte Principe Amedeo Savoia Aosta

=== Walls ===
- Passetto di Borgo
- Leonine Walls

=== Fountains ===
- Fountain of Piazza Scossacavalli, work of Carlo Maderno (moved)
- Fountain of the cannonballs, work of Pietro Lombardi
- Fountain of the tiaras, work of Pietro Lombardi

=== Theaters ===
- Theatre of Nero

== Bibliography ==
- Baronio, Cesare (1697). Descrizione di Roma moderna (in Italian). M.A. and P.A. De Rossi, Roma.
- Adinolfi, Pasquale (1859). La portica di S. Pietro ossia Borgo nell'Età di Mezzo (in Italian). Roma.
- Borgatti, Mariano (1926). Borgo e S. Pietro nel 1300 - 1600 - 1925 (in Italian). Federico Pustet, Roma.
- Ceccarelli, Giuseppe (Ceccarius) (1938). La "Spina" dei Borghi (in Italian). Danesi, Roma.
- Benevolo, Leonardo (1973). Storia dell'Architettura del Rinascimento (in Italian). Laterza, Bari.
- D'Onofrio, Cesare (1978). Castel Sant'Angelo e Borgo tra Roma e Papato (in Italian). Romana Società Editrice, Roma.
- Cederna, Antonio (1979). Mussolini Urbanista. La distruzione di Roma negli anni del consenso (in Italian). Laterza, Bari.
- Krautheimer, Richard (1980). Rome: Profile of a City, 312-1308. Princeton University Press, Princeton. ISBN 0-691-04961-0.
- Krautheimer, Richard (1985). The Rome of Alexander VII, 1655-1667. Princeton University Press, Princeton. ISBN 0-691-00277-0.
- Cambedda, Anna (1990). La demolizione della Spina dei Borghi (in Italian). Fratelli Palombi Editori, Roma. ISSN 0394-9753.
- Gigli, Laura; Zanella, Andrea. Guide rionali di Roma (in Italian). Vol. Borgo (I-V). Fratelli Palombi Editori, Roma. ISSN 0393-2710.
- Coarelli, Filippo (2006). Rome and Environs: An Archaeological Guide. University of California Press, Berkeley and Los Angeles. ISBN 0-520-07961-2.
