= Ricciolo d'Italia =

Border segment between Italy and Vatican City

Curl of Italy
- Footpath
- Ricciolo d'Italia
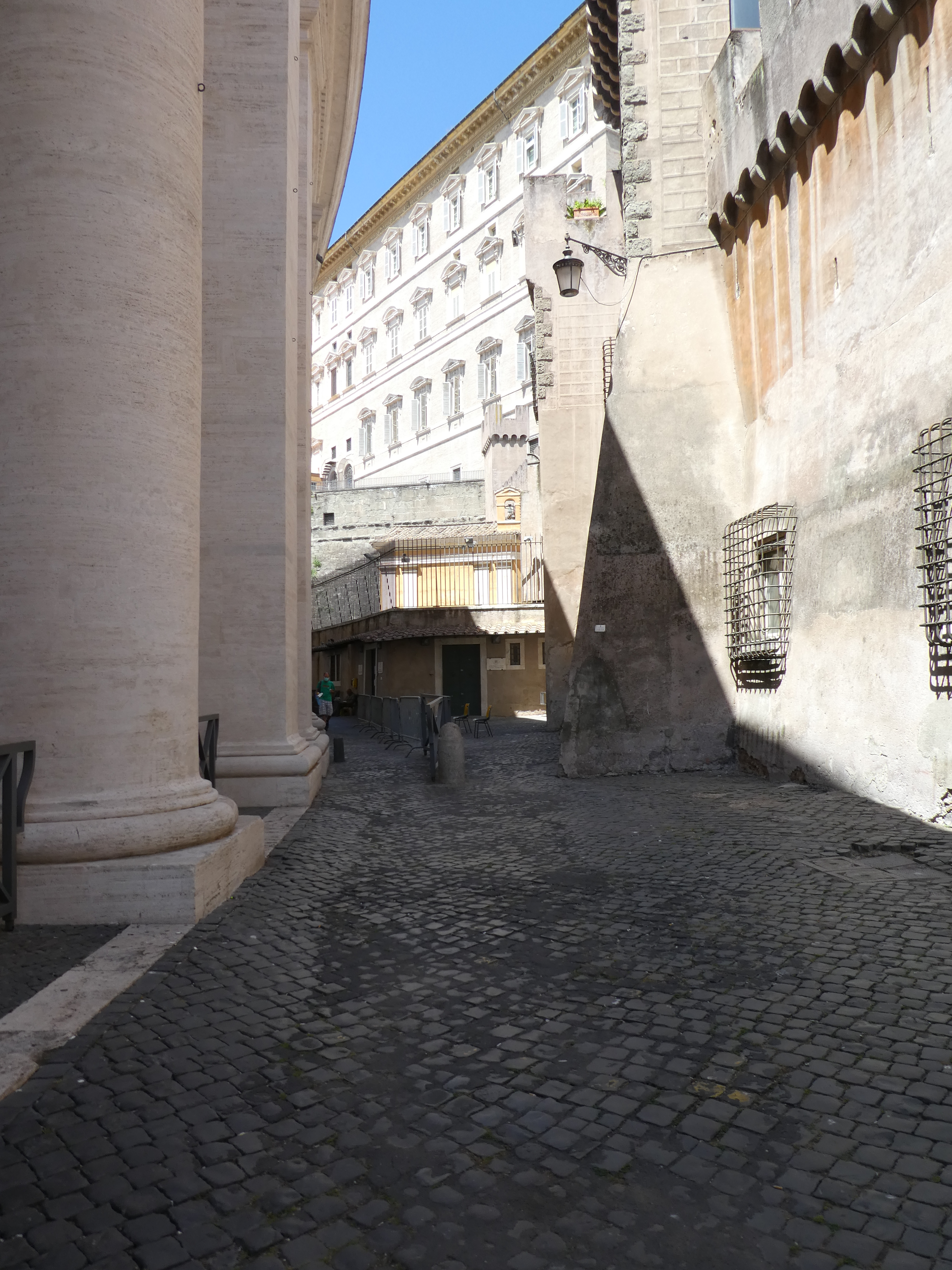
- The Ricciolo d'Italia
- Location: Rome, Italy
- Interactive map of Curl of Italy
- Coordinates: 41.90329°N 12.45683°E

Ricciolo d'Italia (lit. 'the Curl of Italy') is a narrow portion of Italian territory that extends in a curve along the northern edge of St. Peter's Square in Rome. Bordered by Vatican City to the north and south, the Ricciolo d'Italia is a geographic salient with a distinctive curling shape and a width of only about 3 meters. It was formed as part of the original Vatican borders as per the Lateran Treaty of 11 February 1929.

== Description ==
Ricciolo d'Italia, in red

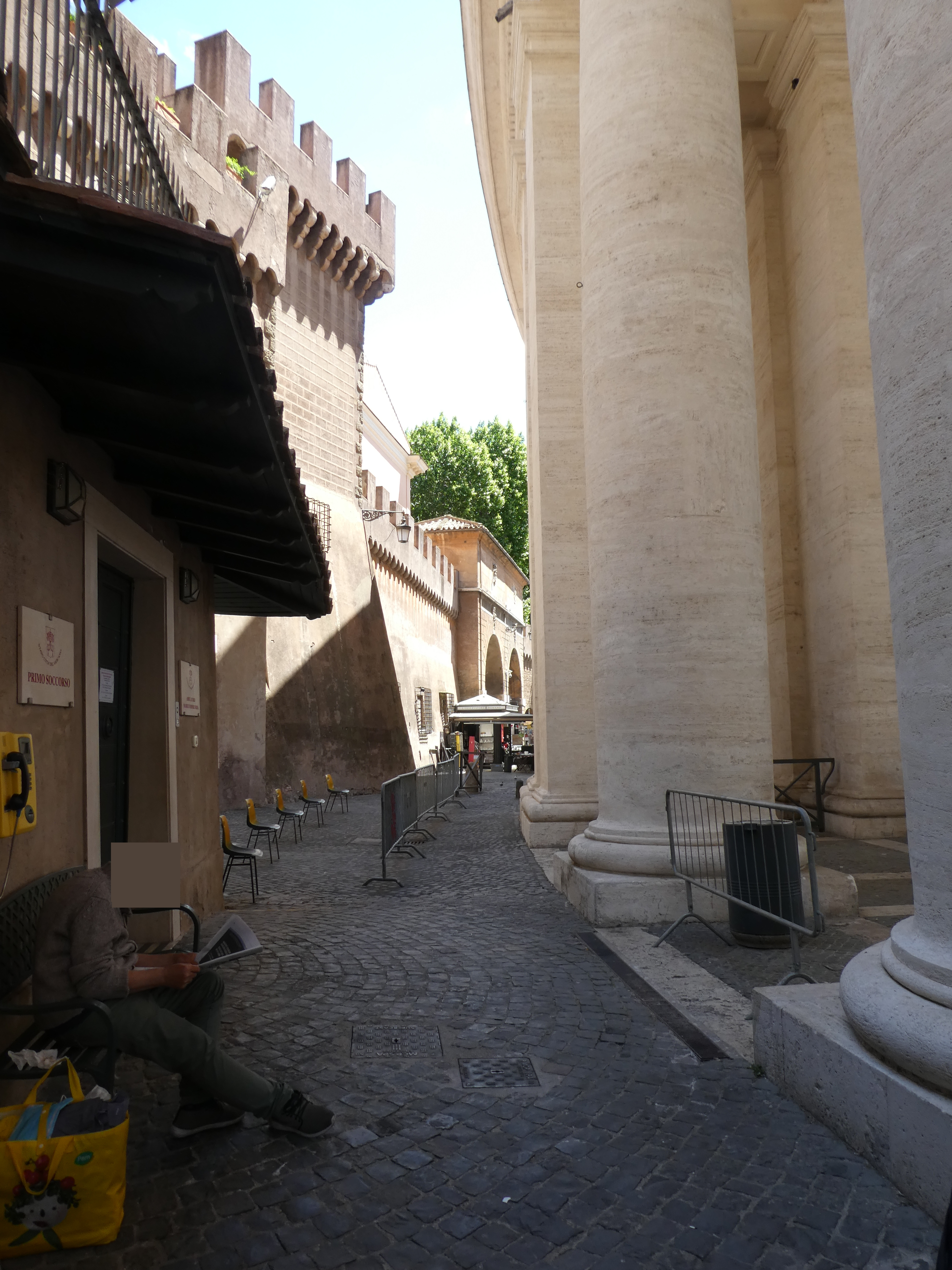
The Ricciolo d'Italia is about three meters wide

The Ricciolo d'Italia begins near the Porta Angelica, on the boundary that follows the Leonine Wall to just before the Bernini colonnade in St. Peter's Square. It curls westward just behind the northern arm of the colonnade. The exact line is marked on the ground by a curved travertine line. It is 3 meters in width, with a length of about 60 meters, and has a semicircular shape. The extreme tip is near the Apostolic Palace.

This strip of Italian soil is mistakenly considered, both because of the incongruity of the situation and for practical reasons, to be part of Vatican territory. Even Italian police forces and Swiss guards stationed there are said to consider the strip as belonging to the Vatican. The curl is freely accessible only in the initial, unfenced part.

Several structures—whose view is limited by their close proximity to the colonnade of St. Peter's—overlook the curl. They include the Church of Saints Martin and Sebastian of the Swiss, the Porta San Pellegrino, the Vatican post office, and the Apostolic Palace.

== History ==
Article 3 of the Lateran Pacts states generically that "The boundaries of said [Vatican] City are indicated on the Plan which constitutes Annex I° of the present Treaty, of which it forms an integral part." The same article also states that when the Holy See intends to hold particular functions in St. Peter's Square, the Italian authorities must withdraw beyond the outer lines of the Bernini colonnade and its extension. Article 15 of the treaty confirms that extraterritoriality does not extend to the areas adjacent to the colonnade.

The 1:5000 scale map attached to the Lateran Pacts, signed by Benito Mussolini and Cardinal Pietro Gasparri, is not particularly detailed and in some places there are small differences between the cartography published in the Official Gazette and the Acta Apostolicae Sedis. However, the official map attached to the Lateran Pacts does depict the area as part of Italy.

For this reason, lacking a precise description of the borders, a bilateral Italian-Vatican commission was formed to verify precisely the boundaries between the two states; however, after three years of work, the conclusions reached in 1932 were not ratified. Since this commission had only an advisory purpose, the Italian government did not recognize any legal significance to this dispute. However, in some cases customs have since been consolidated over time.

In the past, the Metropolitan City of Rome Capital considered the area as belonging to the Vatican, thus failing to issue a license to the wayside shrine located next to the Porta Angelica. The curl, however, appears to be included in the georeferenced map of municipal boundaries, but not in the cadastral map.

Comparison of official maps
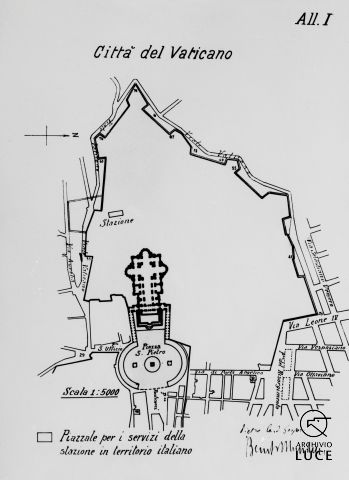
Original of the Lateran Pacts

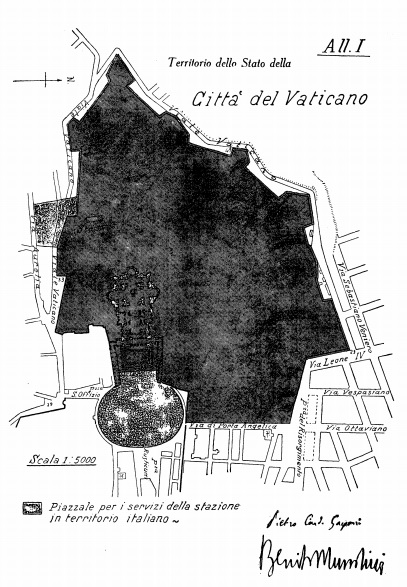
Map in the Official Gazette

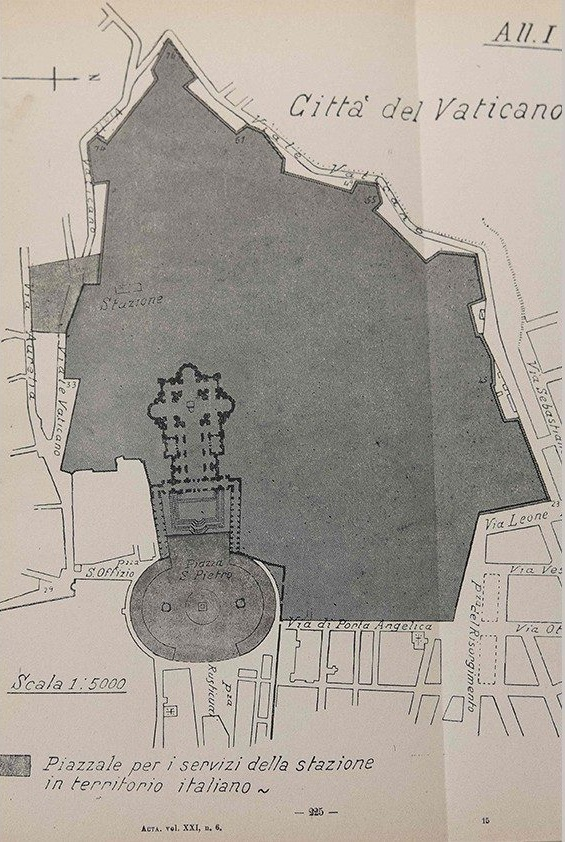
Map on the Acta Apostolicae Sedis

== See also ==
- St. Peter's Square
- Porta San Pellegrino
- Church of Saints Martin and Sebastian of the Swiss
