= Corso Vittorio Emanuele =

Corso Vittorio Emanuele may refer to, among others:

- Corso Vittorio Emanuele II, Milan
- Corso Vittorio Emanuele, Naples
  - Corso Vittorio Emanuele railway station
- Corso Vittorio Emanuele II, Palermo
- Corso Vittorio Emanuele II, Rome
- Corso Vittorio Emanuele II, Turin

== See also ==
- Piazza Vittorio Emanuele (disambiguation)
