= Piazza Vittorio Emanuele =

Piazza Vittorio Emanuele may refer to:

- Piazza Vittorio Emanuele I, Turin, now known as Piazza Vittorio Veneto
- Piazza Vittorio Emanuele II (disambiguation), in various cities

== See also ==
- Corso Vittorio Emanuele (disambiguation)
