= Santi Martino e Sebastiano degli Svizzeri =

Saints Martin and Sebastian of the Swiss
- Santi Martino e Sebastiano degli Svizzeri
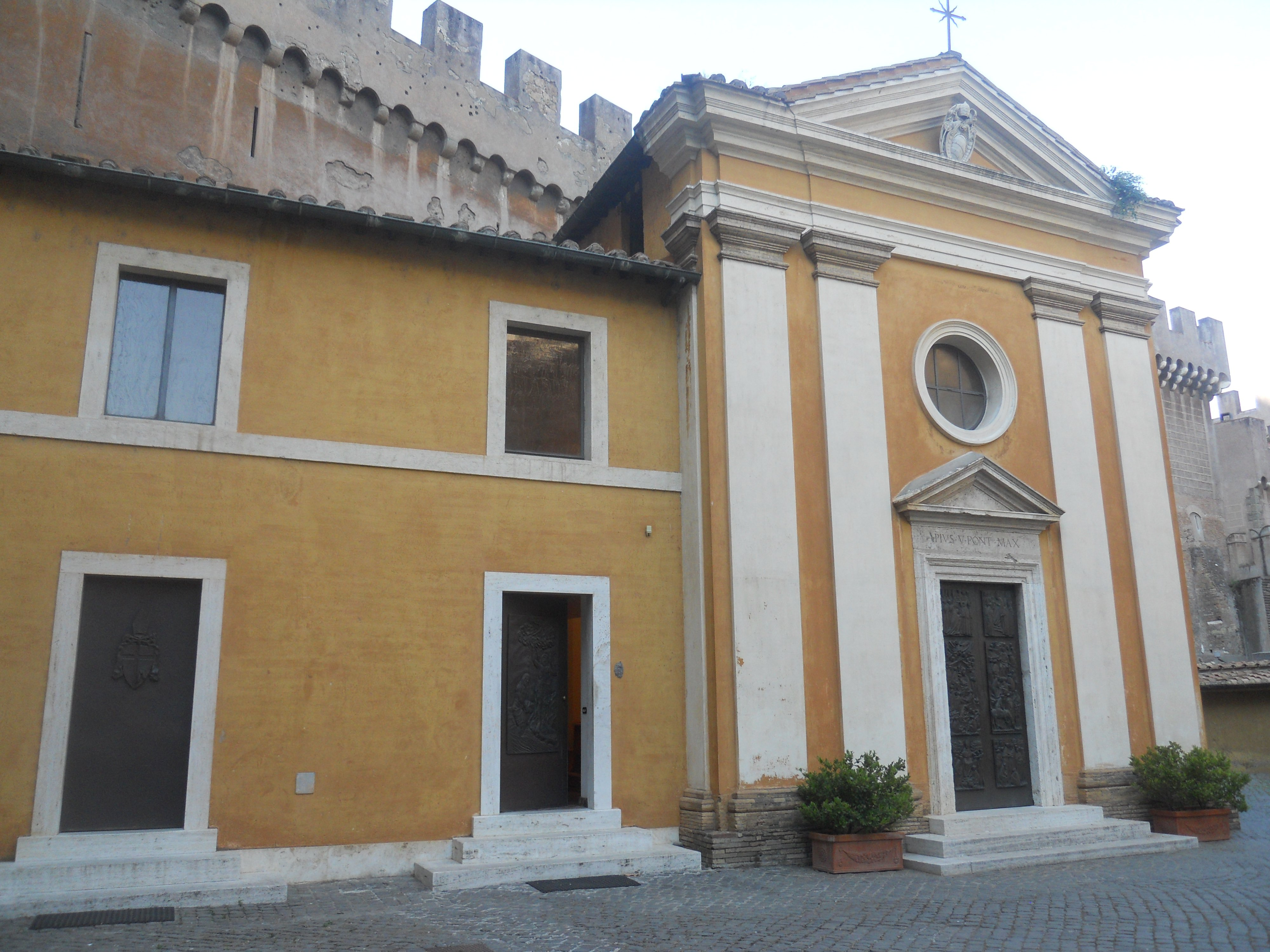
- View of the façade of the church.
- Click on the map for a fullscreen view
- 41°54′12.19″N 012°27′24.2″E
- Location: Vatican City, Rome
- Country: Vatican City
- Denomination: Roman Catholic
- Website: www.gardessuisses.ch/paepstliche-schweizergarde/en/about-us/

History
- Status: Oratory, national church

Architecture
- Architect: Nanni di Baccio Bigio
- Architectural type: Church
- Style: Renaissance
- Completed: 1568

Specifications
- Length: 12 metres (39 ft)
- Width: 9 metres (30 ft)

The Church of Saints Martin and Sebastian of the Swiss (Italian: Santi Martino e Sebastiano degli Svizzeri) is a Roman Catholic oratory in Vatican City. The church was built by Pope Pius V in 1568 to serve as a private chapel for the Pontifical Swiss Guards, whose barracks are located next to Porta San Pellegrino, close to the Apostolic Palace. It is considered the national church of Switzerland in Rome.

The chapel is conveniently located on the path taken every day by the Guards from their barracks to Portone di Bronzo. It is accessible for the guards, day and night. Baptisms and marriages of members of the Guard can also be celebrated with the permission of the priest of the parish of Saint Anne in Vatican.

== History ==
The Swiss Guards arrived at the service of the Pope in Rome in 1506. Pope Pius V ordered the construction of a chapel strictly reserved for the Guards behind the bastion of Nicholas V. The construction of the building dates back to 1568 under the direction of architect Nanni di Baccio Bigio. The church was dedicated to Saint Martin of Tours and Saint Sebastian, both soldiers. (The patron saint of Switzerland, however, is Nicholas of Flüe, who was canonized in 1947 by Pope Pius XII.) Saint Martin was an officer in the Roman army who withdrew to the ascetic and monastic life after his conversion. Saint Sebastian was appointed as a captain of the Praetorian Guard of Roman emperors Diocletian and Maximian and was martyred.

Until the 1648 Peace of Westphalia, the German-speaking Swiss Guards gathered in the church of Santa Maria della Pietà in Campo Santo Teutonico, where there was a side altar reserved for them. From 1657 to 1977, the Guards also used the church of Saint Peregrine in the Vatican (Italian: San Pellegrino in Vaticano) for their religious services.

== Architecture ==
=== Exterior ===
The classical façade consists of four large Doric columns supporting an entablature, but the inscription "Pius V P.M." mentioned by Forcella has disappeared. The pediment, which does not occupy the entire roofline, is decorated with the arms of Pius V. The doorway is surmounted by a small triangular pediment, surmounted by a large porthole. In 1999 the building was enlarged with a forum.

=== Interior ===
The chapel was decorated with frescoes by Giulio Mazzoni, a pupil of Vasari. The frescoes were renovated in the years 1727–1728 by Carlo Roncelli and were finally removed in 1967 for conservation purposes and stored in the Vatican Museums. The frescoes over the altar represent God the Father, while in the right-hand niche is St. Sebastian, and in the left one St. Martin. The altarpiece represents the Annunciation of the Virgin Mary. On the right wall, near the altar, Jesus Christ is depicted on the cross, surrounded by St. Peter and St. John the Evangelist; on the left is the Virgin Mary with St. Anne and the child Jesus. Mazzoni collaborated with stuccoist Ferrante Moreschi, who had made part of the stucco of the Sala Regia in 1565.

== See also ==
- Swiss Guard
- Index of Vatican City-related articles
