= Ponte Vittorio Emanuele II =

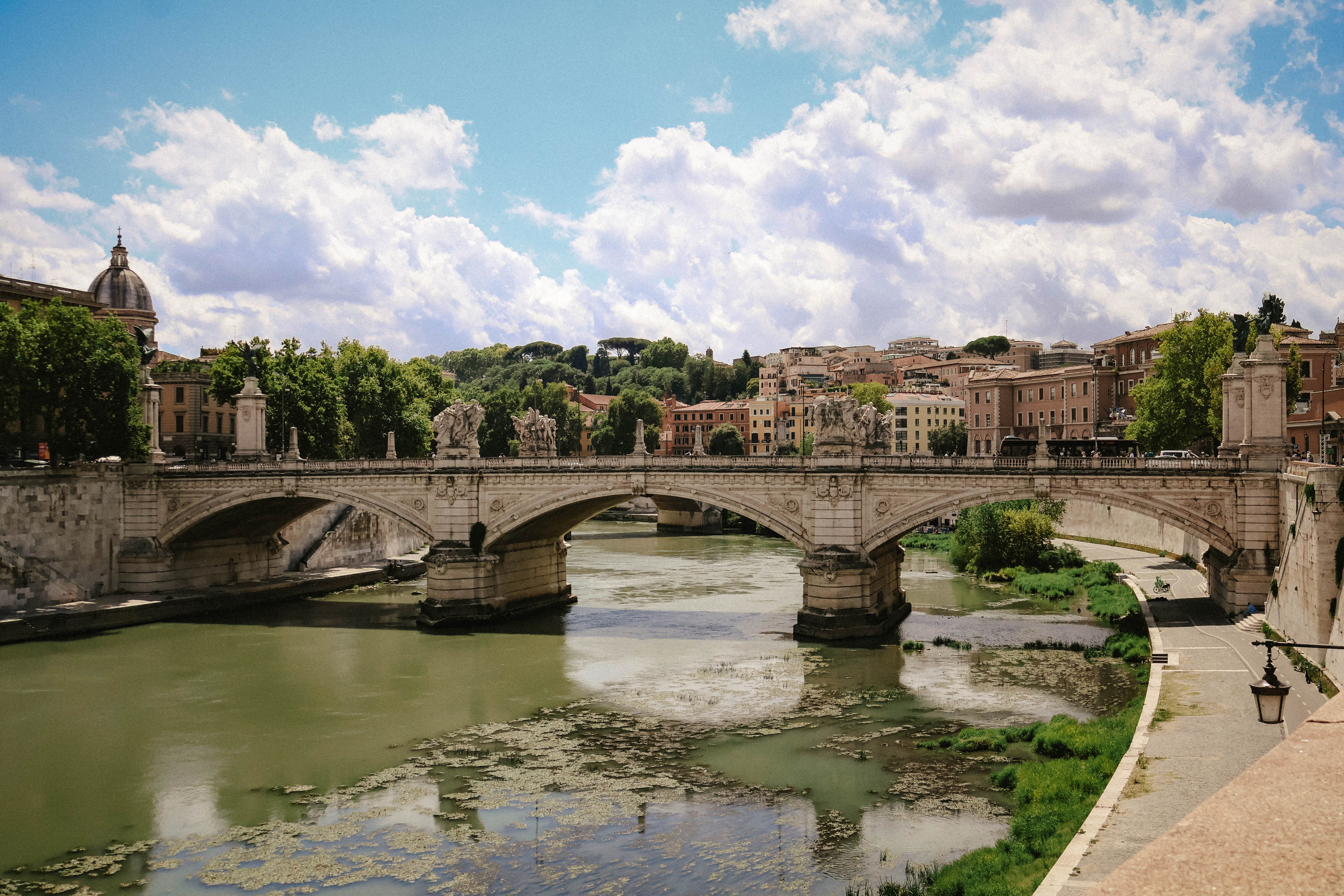
- Coordinates: 41°54′04″N 12°27′51″E
- Crosses: Tiber River
- Locale: Rome, Italy
- Named for: Vittorio Emanuele II of Italy

Location
- Click on the map for a fullscreen view

Ponte Vittorio Emanuele II is a bridge in Rome constructed to designs of 1886 by the architect Ennio De Rossi. Construction was delayed, and it was not inaugurated until 1911. The bridge across the Tiber connects the historic centre of Rome (Corso Vittorio Emanuele, whose axis the bridge extends, and piazza Paoli at the bridgehead) with the rione Borgo and the Vatican City, close what is left of the ancient Pons Neronianus. The bridge commemorating Vittorio Emanuele II of Italy is carried in three arches spanning a distance of 108 metres. It is decorated at the ends with high socles carrying colossal bronze winged Victories and over each of the piers with massive allegorical travertine sculptural groups.
