= Pons Neronianus =

Ancient Roman bridge in Rome

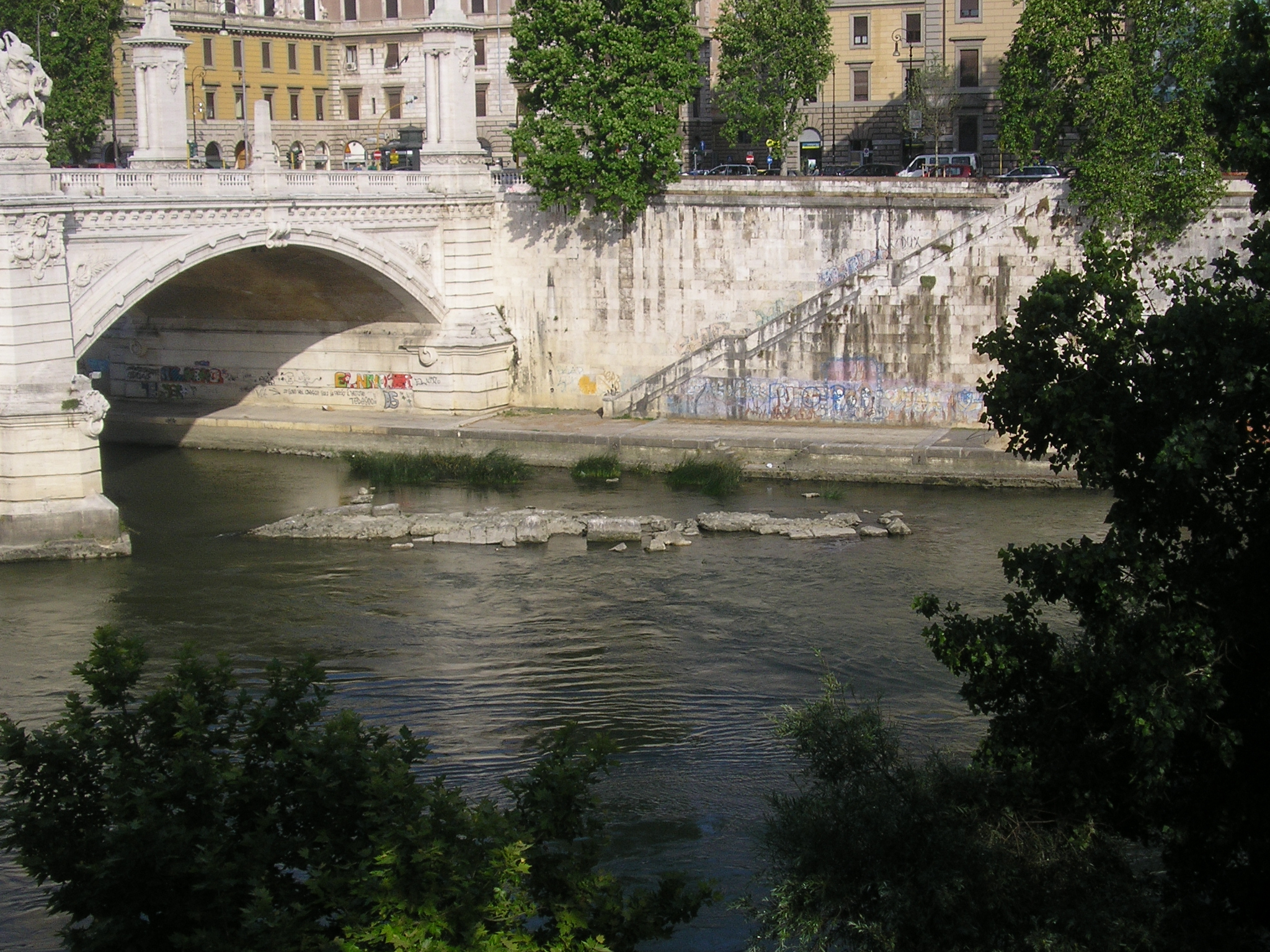
- Remains of the Pons Neronianus in the Tiber in Rome

- Location within Rome
- Interactive map of Pons Neronianus
- 41°54′04″N 12°27′51″E
- Location: Rome

The Pons Neronianus or Bridge of Nero was an ancient bridge in Rome built during the reign of the emperors Caligula or Nero to connect the western part of the Campus Martius with the Ager Vaticanus ("Vatican Fields"), where the imperial family owned land along the Via Cornelia.

== History ==
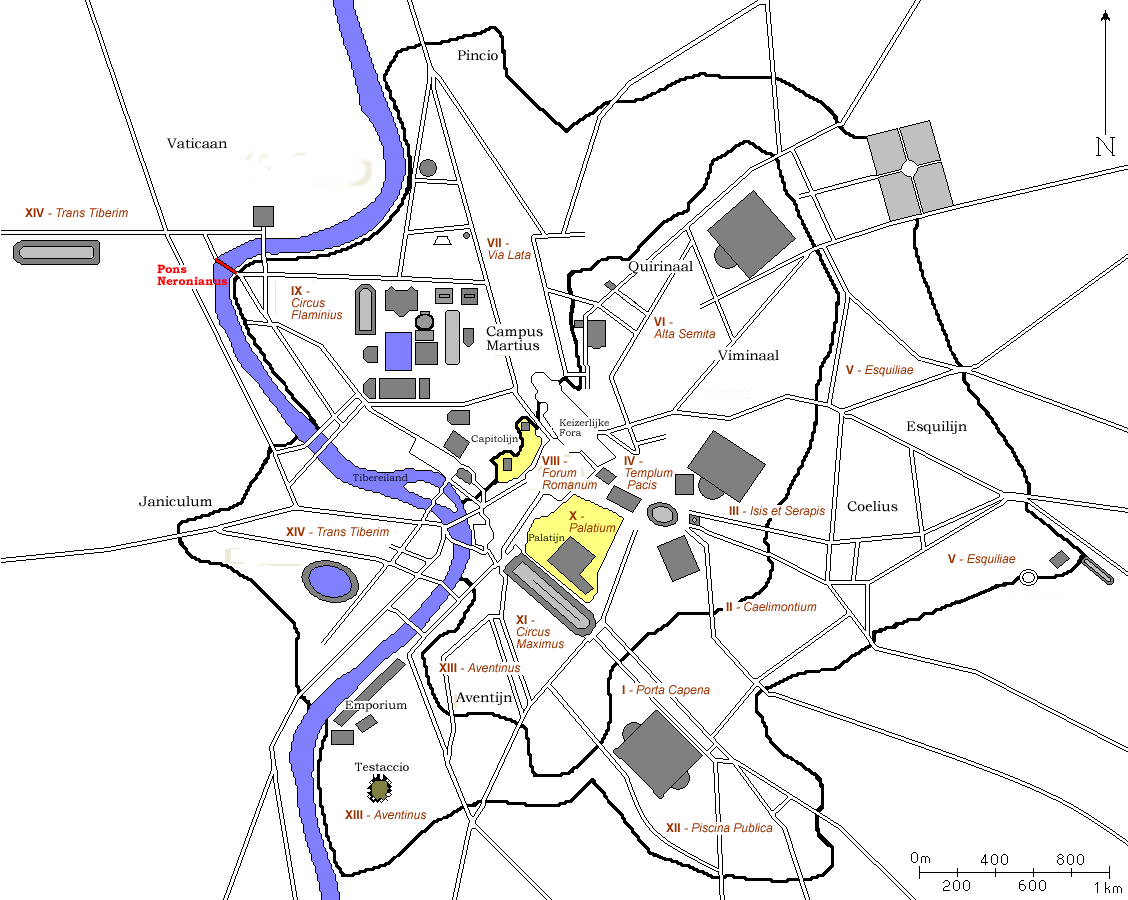
Pons Neronianus on a map of ancient Rome around 300 AD

There is no direct evidence that Nero actually built the bridge named after him. It may well have been named the 'Bridge of Nero' because the area on the right bank of the Tiber beyond the bridgehead was still named the "Plain(s) of Nero" well into the Medieval period, so that the inhabitants of Rome at that time, not knowing the origins of the ruined bridge, named it after the region rather than after Nero himself. Whatever its origins, the bridge gave Nero easier access to the Gardens of Agrippina, his mother Agrippina the Younger's riverside gardens and portico which were located on the right bank just downstream from the bridge.

The Emperor Caligula built a circus on the right bank of the Tiber. The historian Tacitus says it was in this circus, renamed the Circus of Nero, that the Emperor Nero executed the Christians who were accused of causing the Great Fire of Rome of 64 AD, in order to entertain the people of Rome after that fire. It is believed that Nero replaced the timber bridge of the Via Triumphalis with the stone bridge named after him, the Pons Neronianus or 'Triumphalis' because the Via Triumphalis, the Triumphal Way, passed over it. The people of Rome most likely crossed the Pons Neronianus to get to the Circus of Nero.

Starting with Titus, the victorious Emperors celebrating their Triumphs entered Rome marching across the Pons Neronianus along the Via Triumphalis. It is probable that the capacity of the Pons Neronianus could not cope with the day to day traffic in Rome because within a century of its completion the Emperor Hadrian built the Pons Aelius less than two hundred metres upstream. Nero's bridge was also called Pons Vaticanus (meaning "Vatican Bridge" in Latin), because it connected the Ager Vaticanus to the left bank. The bridge may well have been in ruins in the fourth century. Certainly, by the Middle Ages the bridge was called Pons ruptus ("Broken Bridge"), because it was broken. In the fifteenth century Pope Julius II planned to restore it.

The Pons Neronianus is not mentioned in the classical literary sources or regionary catalogues; it is mentioned only in the medieval Mirabilia Urbis Romae and Graphia Aureae Urbis Romae as one of the ruins of Rome that could still be seen at that time. Neither is it mentioned in Procopius’ account of the siege of Rome by the Goths in 537. The evidence that the Pons Neronianus was out of use by the fourth century was first cited by Henri Jordan. It is based on a brief passage in Prudentius:

Ibimus ulterius, qua fert uia pontis Hadriani,
laeuam deinde fluminis petemus.
Transtiberina prius soluit sacra peruigil sacerdos,
mox huc recurrit duplicatque uota.

We shall cross over where the way of Hadrian’s bridge leads,
Then we shall seek the river’s left bank.
First the sleepless priest performs the Transtiberine rites,
Then he hurries back to this side to repeat his prayers.

Prudentius was still alive when Honorius and Arcadius built the triumphal arch referred to in the text quoted about a dual ceremony at St. Peter's Basilica and the Basilica of Saint Paul Outside the Walls which states that the route to St. Peter’s Basilica from the east bank crossed at "Hadrian’s bridge", the Pons Aelius upstream. As passing over the Pons Neronianus would have been a shorter way to St. Peter’s Basilica from the left bank, it becomes clear that the Pons Neronianus was out of use by that time.

The Pons Neronianus crossed the river immediately below the modern Ponte Vittorio Emanuele II, but at a slightly different angle; little of the ancient structure survives today. When the Tiber is at low water level it is possible to see the foundation of one of the four piers that once supported the Pons Neronianus. However, in the nineteenth century all the piers were still visible above water. These were removed to allow boats to pass safely up the Tiber.

== See also ==
- List of Roman bridges
- Roman architecture
- Roman engineering
