= Piazza Vittorio =

Piazza Vittorio may refer to:

- Piazza Vittorio Emanuele II, Rome
- Piazza Vittorio Veneto (formerly Vittorio Emanuele I), Turin

== See also ==
- Piazza Vittorio Emanuele II (disambiguation)
