= Porta San Pellegrino =

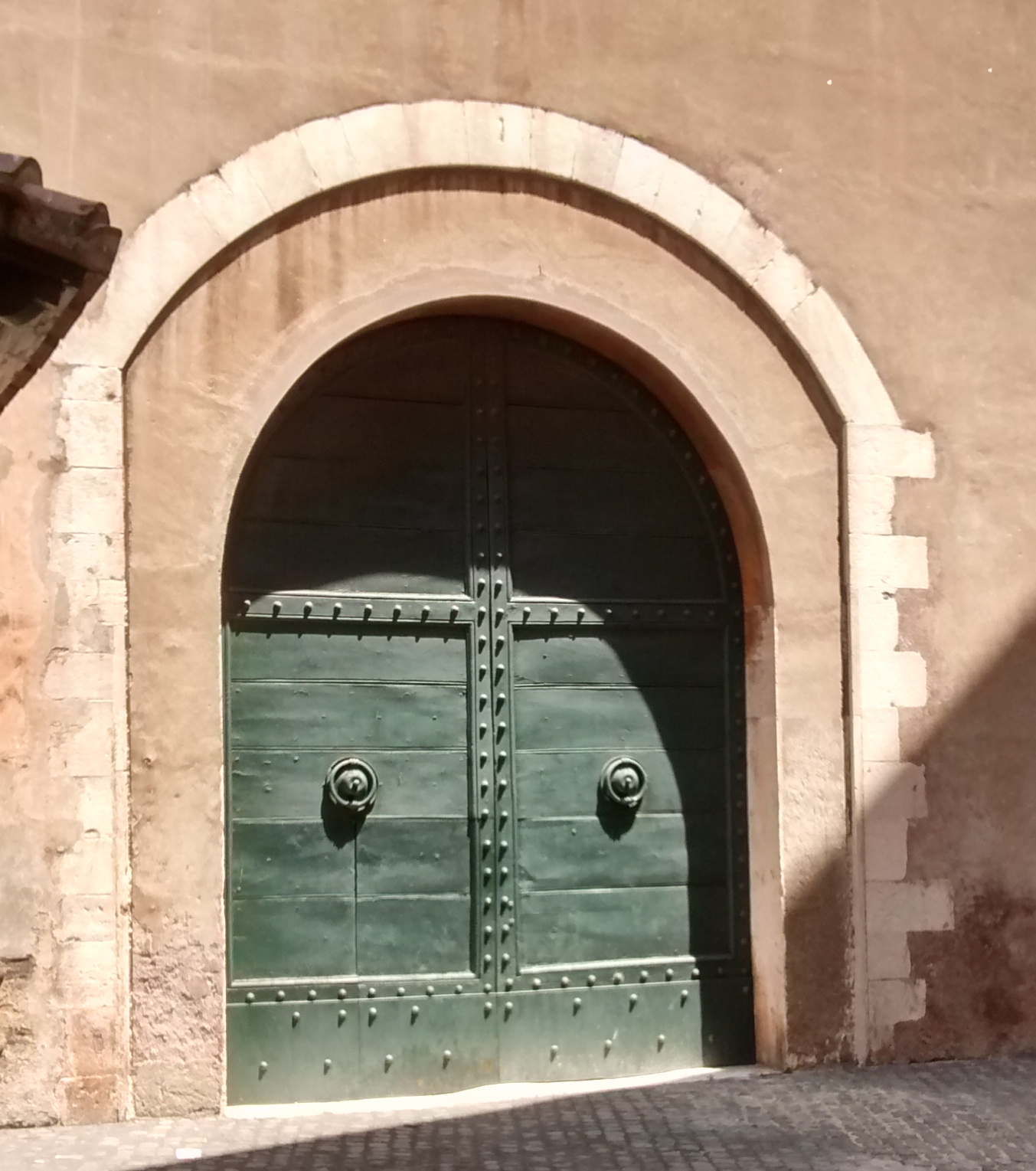
- Porta San Pellegrino
- Click on the map for a fullscreen view

General information
- Location: Vatican City
- Coordinates: 41°54′12.6″N 012°27′25.74″E

Porta San Pellegrino is a gate in the outer wall of Vatican City. It is located beside Bernini's Colonnade and the small Vatican post; it is also known as Porta Viridaria. Rebuilt by Pope Alexander VI in 1492, the gate is surmounted by his papal coat of arms. The gate is little used. Originally part of the ninth-century Leonine Walls commissioned by Pope Leo IV to defend St. Peter's Basilica from Saracen raids, it once marked the principal northern entrance for pilgrims. Although its military purpose has long passed, the gate's austere ashlar masonry and heraldic reliefs still evoke its defensive and ceremonial significance.

== History ==
Porta San Pellegrino originally formed one of the three principal entrances in the Leonine Walls, consecrated by Pope Leo IV on 27 June 852 to defend St. Peter's Basilica and the surrounding Borgo district from Saracen raids. The ancient Via Trionfale led directly under this gate, guiding pilgrims from the centre of the future piazza towards Monte Mario. In 1411 the antipapal John XXIII demolished the gate's original towers, leaving the medieval wall weakened. Mid-century, Pope Nicholas V extended the Vatican’s northern enclosure, and Porta San Pellegrino thereafter marked the junction between the Passetto di Borgo and the new fortifications. Pope Alexander VI undertook a full reconstruction in 1492, adding two square crenellated towers and affixing his family's arms and a Latin dedicatory inscription above the interior arch. After Pope Pius IV's mid-16th-century enlargement of Borgo, the gate lay beyond the new defensive line and was closed in 1563; it remained sealed until Pope Leo XII reopened it in 1823 to give the Pontifical Swiss Guard direct access to their barracks.

== Architecture ==
The surviving fabric of Porta San Pellegrino consists of a single semicircular stone arch flanked by low, square towers topped with machicolated parapets. The inner face bears the Borgia coat of arms—a bull and an eagle—in high relief, set beneath a weathered inscription commemorating Alexander VI's restorations. The ashlar masonry and minimal decorative carving reflect the gate's strictly military function, while the scale of its towers hints at its role as a key access point to the papal city.

== Modern use ==
Today the gate stands almost hidden beneath the buildings of the Apostolic Palace and sees little pedestrian traffic. On 6 February 2015, however, the Vatican announced completion of a small welfare facility immediately adjacent to Bernini's Colonnade, providing three daily showers and a barber's chair for homeless pilgrims (closed on Wednesdays and during large events), along with hygiene kits.

== See also ==
- Index of Vatican City-related articles
