= Via Cornelia =

Ancient Roman Road

Via Cornelia is an ancient Roman road that supposedly ran east–west along the northern wall of the Circus of Nero on land now covered by the southern wall of St. Peter's Basilica. The location is closely associated with the Via Aurelia and the Via Triumphalis.

== History ==
There is some belief amongst archeologists that the Via Cornelia did not exist and that the name is a mutilation of the name, Via Aurelia. This conjecture stems from the fact that the Via Cornelia is only mentioned in the itineraries and witnesses of the seventh and eighth centuries; for in those centuries the population of Rome decreased from approximately one and a half million to sixty thousand and, the people were impoverished and could hardly speak Latin well. These citizens also would have had no idea of the topography of the Imperial period. Contrary to these likely unfounded notations, well-authenticated documents from the fourth century state that Saint Peter was buried along the Via Triumphalis.

An excavation in 1924 at the site of Pisidian Antioch discovered an inscribed stone dating from approximately 93 AD that offers strong evidence that the Via Cornelia had existed prior to the reign of Constantine. The inscription on the stone mentions a commander of the eighth Augustinian legion under Vespasian and Titus who had been a supervisor of the Via Aurelia and the Via Cornelia.

== Location ==
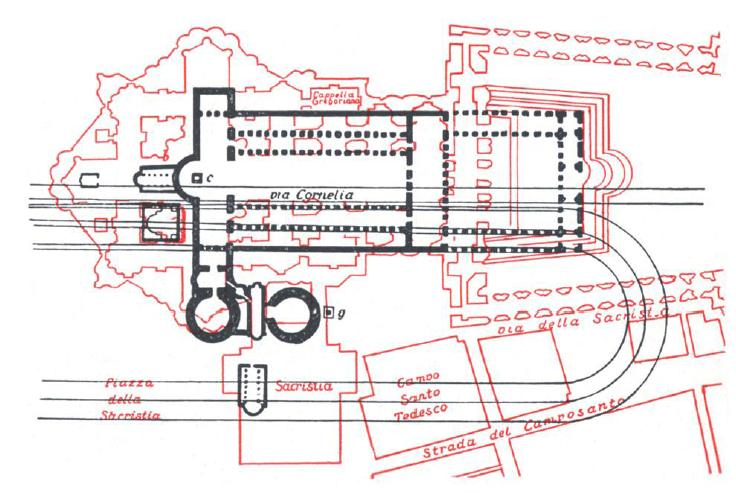
Former generally accepted plan of Vatican topography, now the locations of Via Cornelia and Nero's Circus on this plan are known to be inaccurate

Formerly, it was erroneously, but generally accepted, that the southern walls of St. Peter's Basilica rested on the northern walls of Nero’s Circus, and that a street ran north of the circus under the basilica (see figure). Excavations of the basilica and surrounding area, however, have shown that this was not entirely correct. An excavation in 1936 in the Piazza San Pietro discovered traces of a road that may be the post-Constantinian Via Cornelia. A fragment of pre-Constantinian paved road along the same alignment also was found at the southwest corner of the basilica.

It is now believed that the Via Cornelia came from the east and ran west, gently rising near the present southernmost fountain in Saint Peter's Square. Slightly before this point the Via Aurelia forked off from it and headed southwest, while the Via Cornelia continued westward just south of façade of the basilica and eventual on toward Caere.

Via Triumphalis is believed to have come from Pons Neronianus toward Saint Peter's Square, and then to have veered northwest toward the business section of Vatican City. The present day Via della Conciliazione follows approximately the same path as the Via Cornelia did. In recent years the Vatican authorities reopened excavations of the Via Triumphalis necropolis that was first partially uncovered during the 1950s. The excavations have revealed an extensive ancient Roman cemetery.

== Function ==
It is possible that the Via Cornelia may have been built by Caligula to improve the approach to the imperial gardens, the Horti Agrippinae. Therefore, it may have formed the northern boundary of the gardens in Nero’s time. It also would have connected the Circus of Nero to the basilica and to a double row of mausoleums.
