= Porta Angelica =

Former City gate of Rome

Coordinates: 41.9062°N 12.4567°E

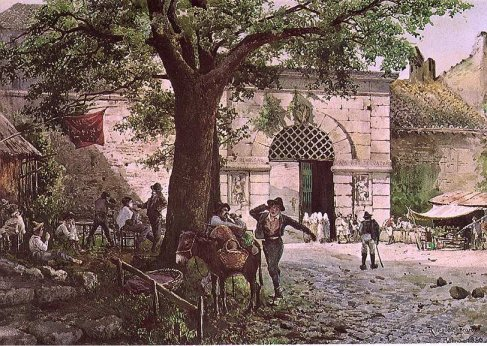
Porta Angelica in a watercolor by Ettore Roesler Franz

Porta Angelica was a gate of the Leonine Wall in Rome (Italy).

it rose close to the corner of the present Viale dei Bastioni di Michelangelo, Piazza Risorgimento and Via di Porta Angelica, where a coat of arms of Pope Pius XI is now visible.

The gate, built before 1563 by Pope Pius IV with an elegant and simple bossage, was the main access route for the pilgrims arriving to Rome through Via Cassia or via Flaminia.

The name Angelica (Italian for "Angelic") originates from the Christian name of the Pope who built it, Giovanni Angelo Medici, who wanted to convey the memory of his own works, not just through the inscriptions, but also in the denominations of the monuments he realized (also Porta Pia is dedicated to him).

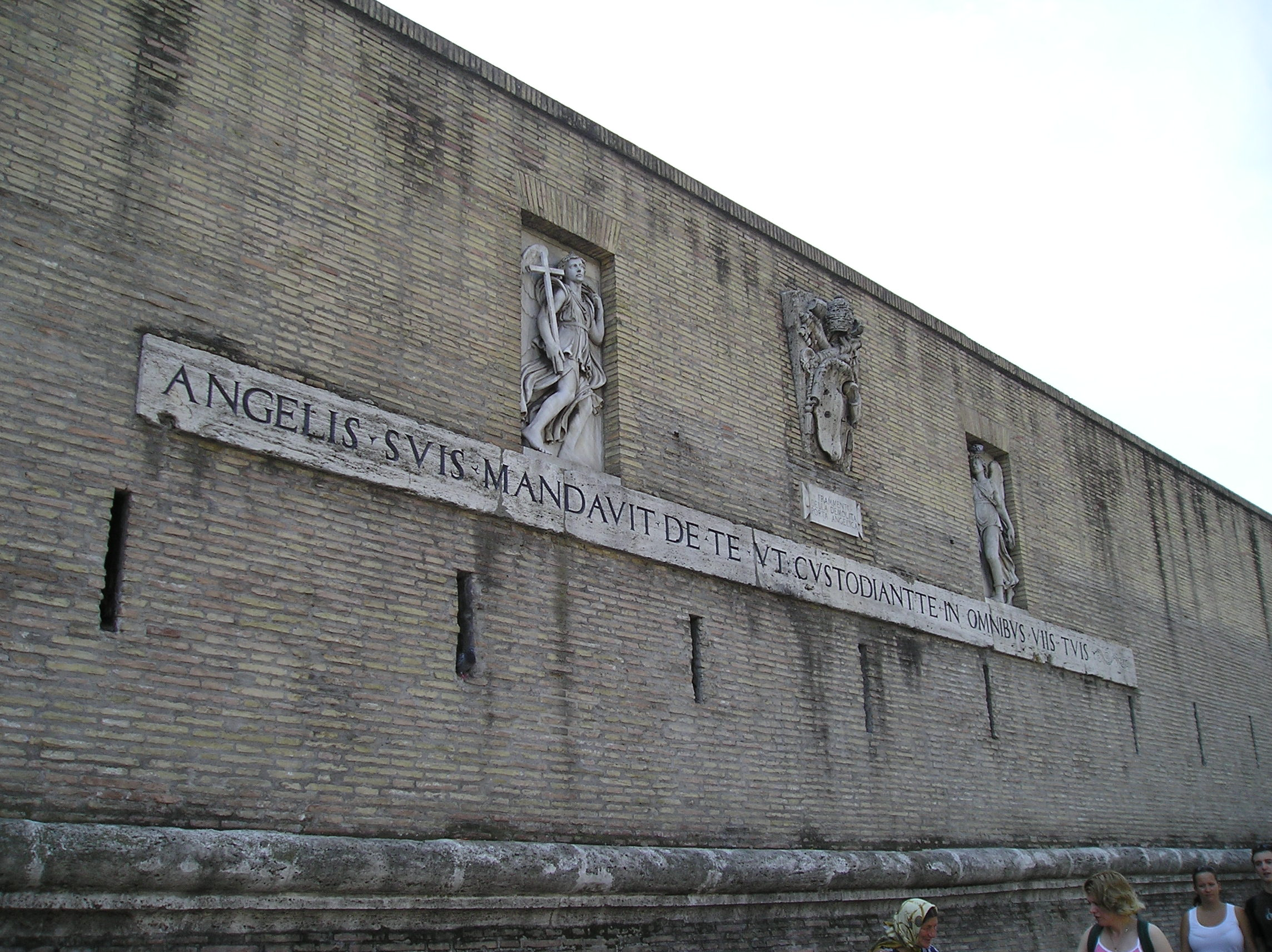
The inscription and the angels of Porta Angelica

Some remains of the gate are still visible enchased in the wall along Viale dei Bastioni di Michelangelo: they are a linear inscription "ANGELIS SVIS MANDAVIT DE TE VT CVSTODIANT TE IN OMNIBVS VIIS TVIS" ("He sent his angels to you so that they watch over you along all your ways"), the coat of arms of Pius IV (from which the balls have been removed) and two statues of cross-bearing angels, formerly placed on the sides of the gate. According to some testimonies, the gate also bore the following writing, alike the one on Porta Castello: "QUI VULT SALVAM REMP. NOS SEQUATUR" ("Who wants the Republic to be save, follow us"), an incitement coming from the two angels on the sides of both gates.

According to a custom in force at least since the 5th century, the gate was farmed out to private citizens, together with the annexed guard-house. In 1673 the management of the gate (including the collection of the toll as well) was entrusted to the noble Roman family Carpegna and, in 1750, to Lambertini. Since both families were relatives of the ruling pontiffs, probably the city traffic through that passage was rather intense, so as to ensure an adequate income.

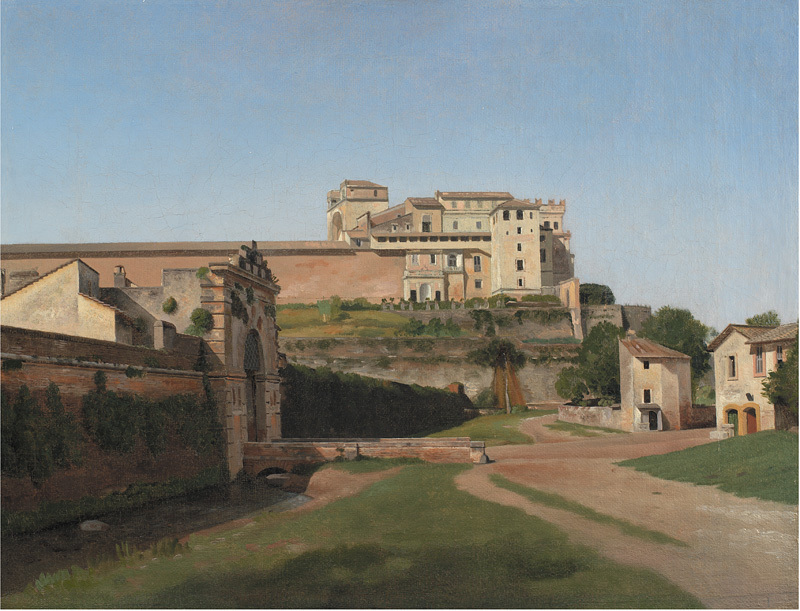
C. W. Eckersberg's painting dated 1813

At the beginning of the 18th century, some iron cages were added to the attic of the gate: their purpose was to contain the heads of executed men, according to a centuries-old practice to publicly exhibit the condemned people. The first head, that was caged in Porta Angelica on July 4, 1703, belonged to a certain Mattia Troiani, a servant of a Monsignor of the Curia who was killed by him.

Here took place, on April 30, 1849, the first attack against the Roman Republic launched by the French troops led by General Charles Oudinot and fought against by the defenders on the orders of Giuseppe Garibaldi.

The gate was demolished in 1888, together with the whole stretch of wall that linked it to Castel Sant'Angelo, as part of the urban works intended to make the Rione Borgo more modern and usable.

== Bibliography ==
- Mauro Quercioli, Le mura e le porte di Roma, Newton Compton, 1982.
- Laura G. Cozzi, Le porte di Roma, F. Spinosi Ed., Rome, 1968.
