= Passetto di Borgo =

Papal bridge in Rome

Coordinates: 41°54′12″N 12°27′42″E

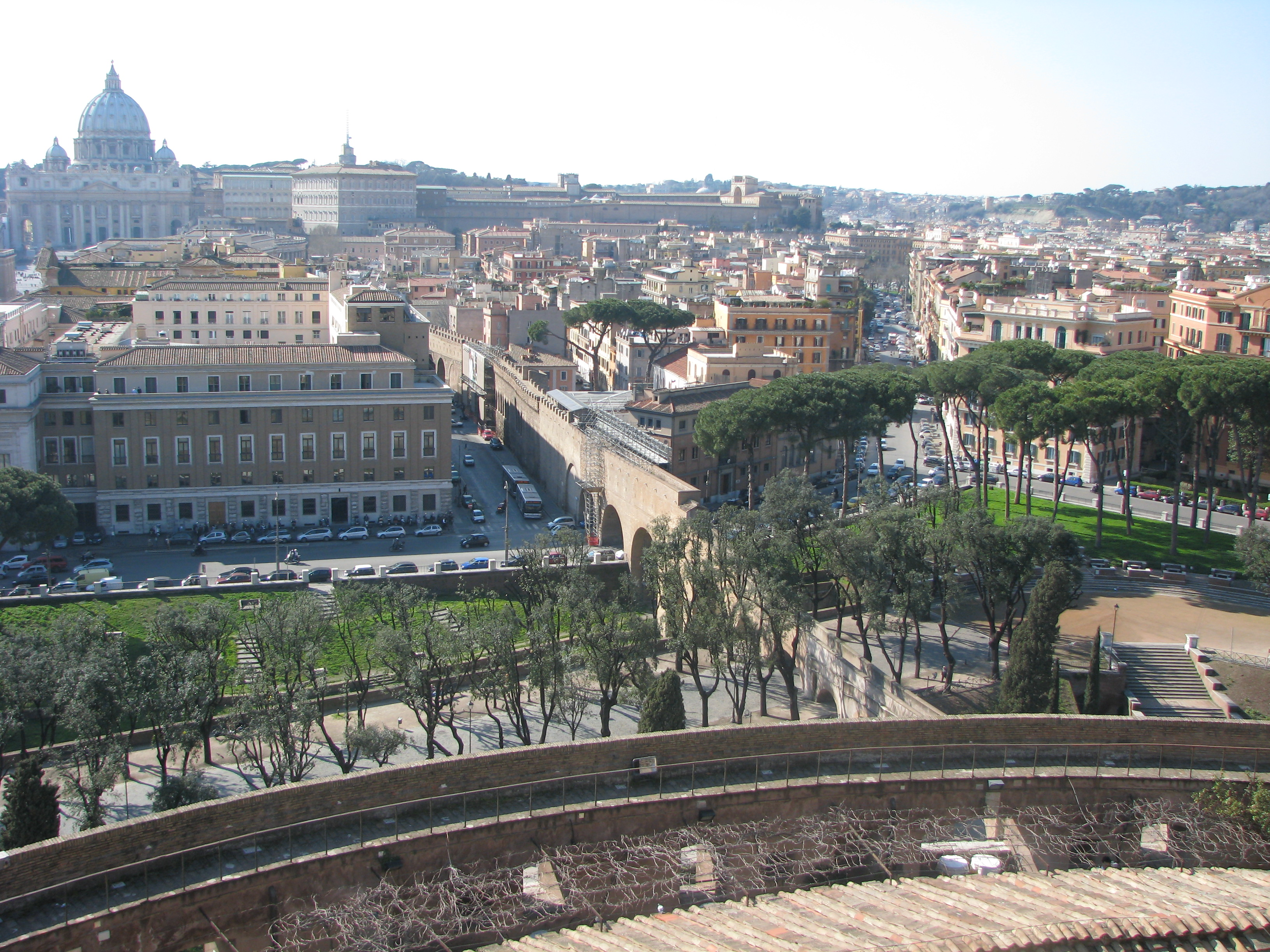
Route of the "Passetto" from the Vatican (in the background) to Castel Sant'Angelo.

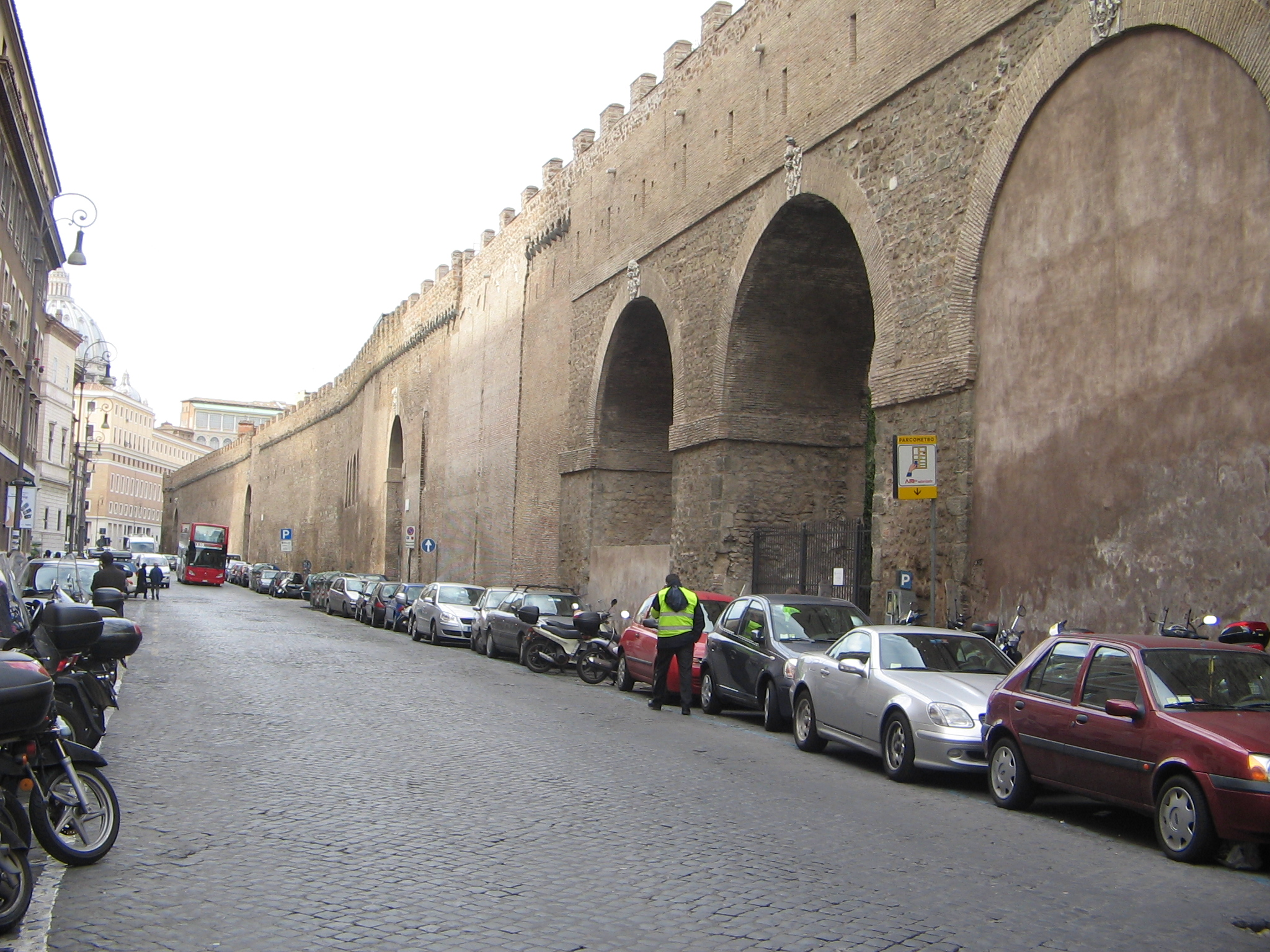
The southern side of the "Passetto" seen from the Borgo S. Angelo.

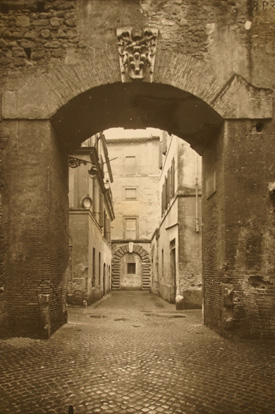
The Passetto in its original context: in background the rear side of Palazzo Rusticucci-Accoramboni seen from Vicolo del Farinone, before the demolition of the neighborhood (c. 1930)

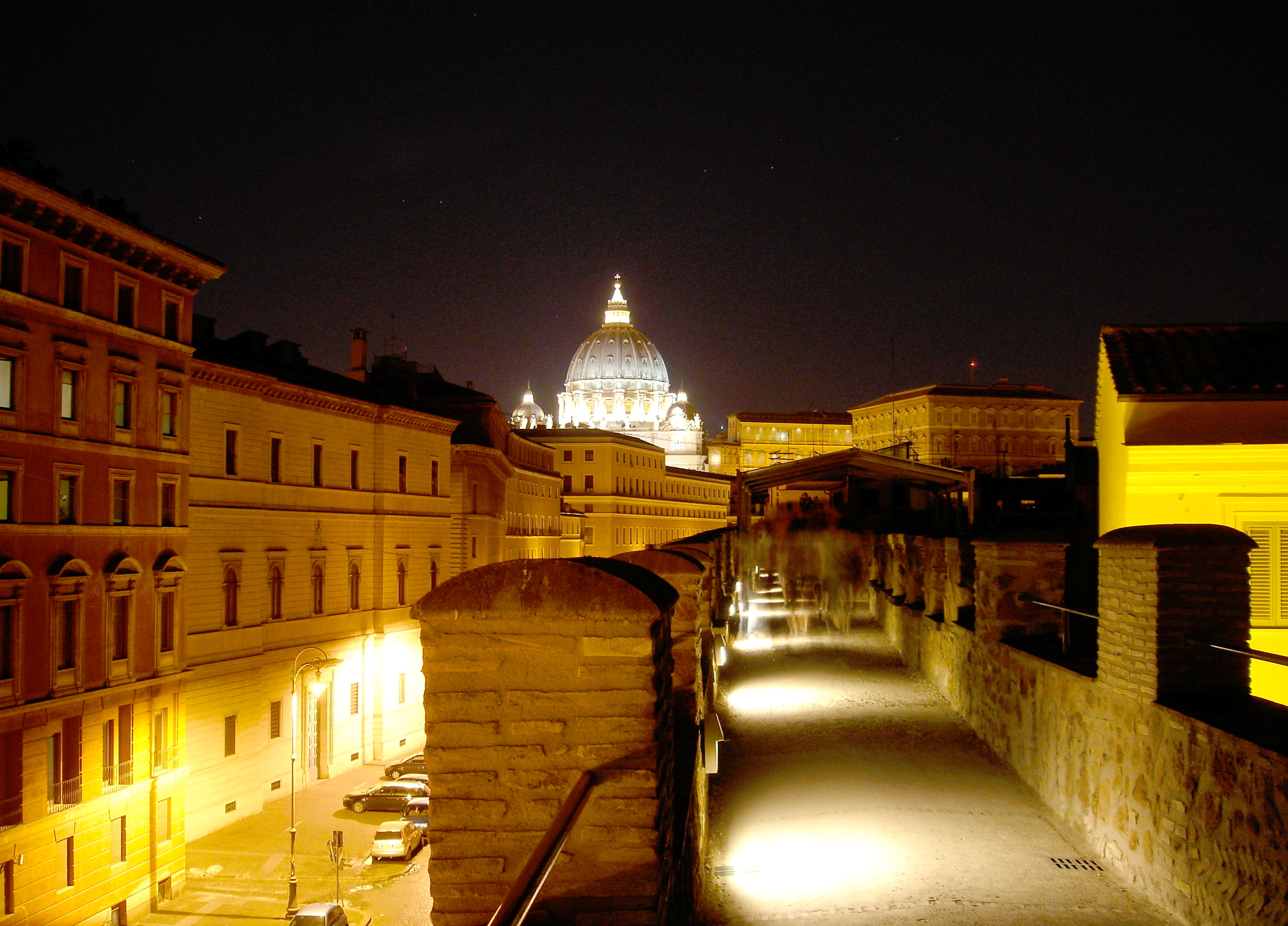
Over the Passetto, going towards the Vatican.

The Passetto di Borgo, also called Er Coridore di Borgo or the Passetto, is an elevated passage that links Vatican City with the Castel Sant'Angelo in Rome. The passage is an approximately 800-metre-long (2,600 ft) corridor, built within an old city wall of Rome. Its most significant purpose was to provide the Pope with a protected escape route from the Vatican, and it was used at least twice for this reason. It is located in the rione of Borgo.

== History ==
The Passetto started its life as part of a defensive wall built by Totila around 547, during the Gothic War. It was repeatedly modified over the next millennium to meet changing goals. Pope Leo IV rebuilt the city wall around 852, adding a walkway. The exact date when the passage was added is unclear, but it was likely either in 1277 under Pope Nicholas III, or in the fourteenth century under Pope Boniface IX. Further defensive features were added under subsequent popes. In its current form, it has two levels: the top level is a standard patrol walkway, and underneath it is the hidden enclosed escape passage.

On at least two occasions it served as an escape route for Popes in danger. Pope Alexander VI crossed it in 1494, when Charles VIII invaded the city and the pope's life was in peril. Clement VII escaped to safety through this passage during the Sack of Rome in 1527, when troops of the Holy Roman Emperor, Charles V, massacred almost the entire Swiss Guard on the steps of St Peter's Basilica.

== See also ==
- Index of Vatican City-related articles
- Vasari Corridor, Florence
- Passages for Maria Maddalena de' Medici (incl. the corridoio mediceo), also in Florence
