= Piazza Vittorio Emanuele II =

Piazza Vittorio Emanuele II may refer to:

- Piazza Vittorio Emanuele II, Rome
  - Piazza Vittorio Emanuele II (Rome Metro), a station on the Rome Metro
- Piazza Vittorio Emanuele II, Florence, now known as Piazza della Repubblica

== See also ==
- Piazza Vittorio (disambiguation)
