= Circus of Nero =

Ancient Roman circus in Rome

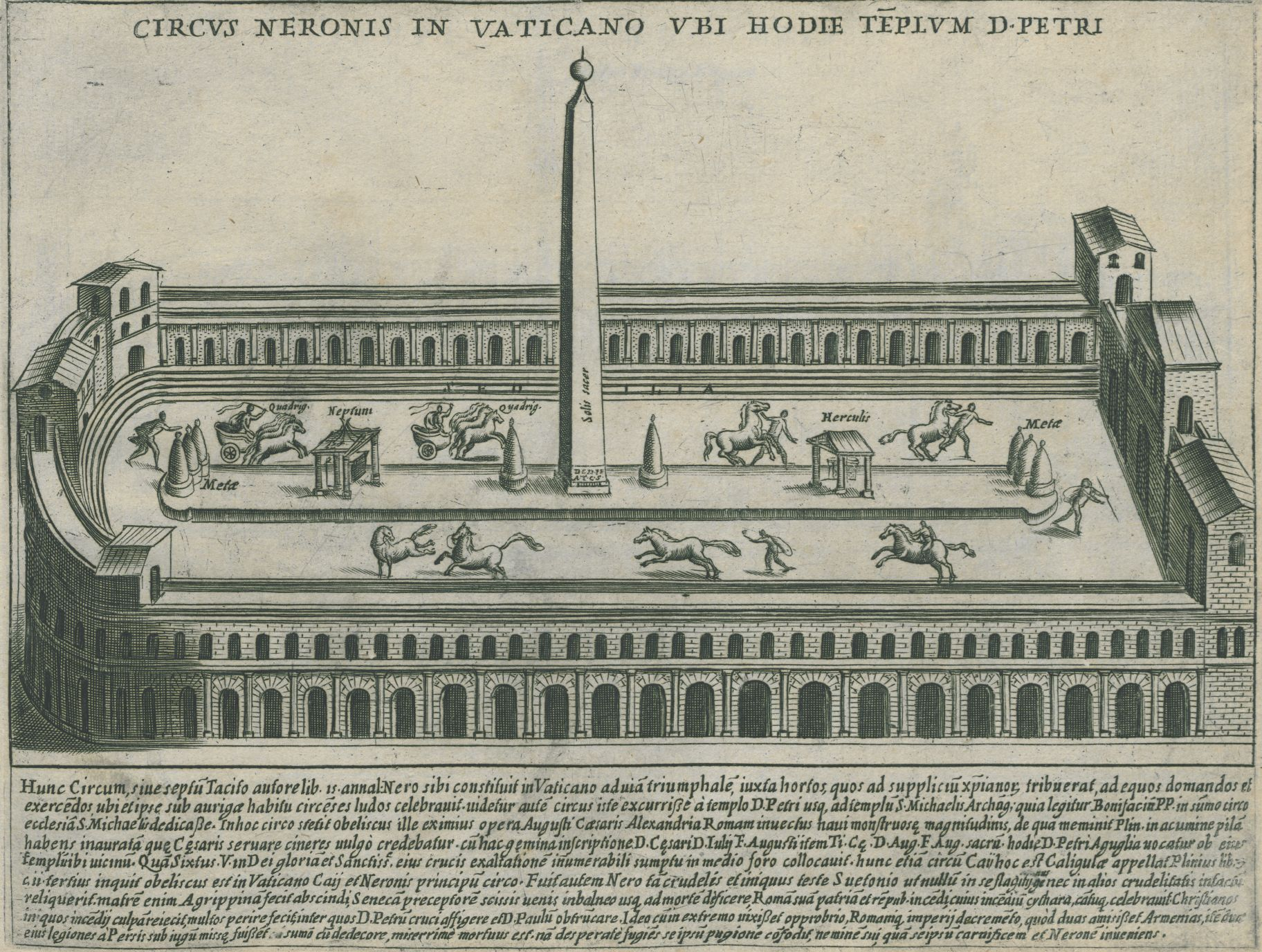
- Drawing of the Circus of Nero (Pietro Santi Bartoli, 1699)

- Shown within Augustan Rome
- Interactive map of Circus of Nero
- 41°54′06″N 12°27′19″E
- Type: Circus

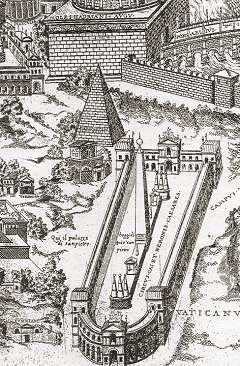
Circus of Nero from a map of Pirro Ligorio from 1561, with the mausoleum of Hadrian

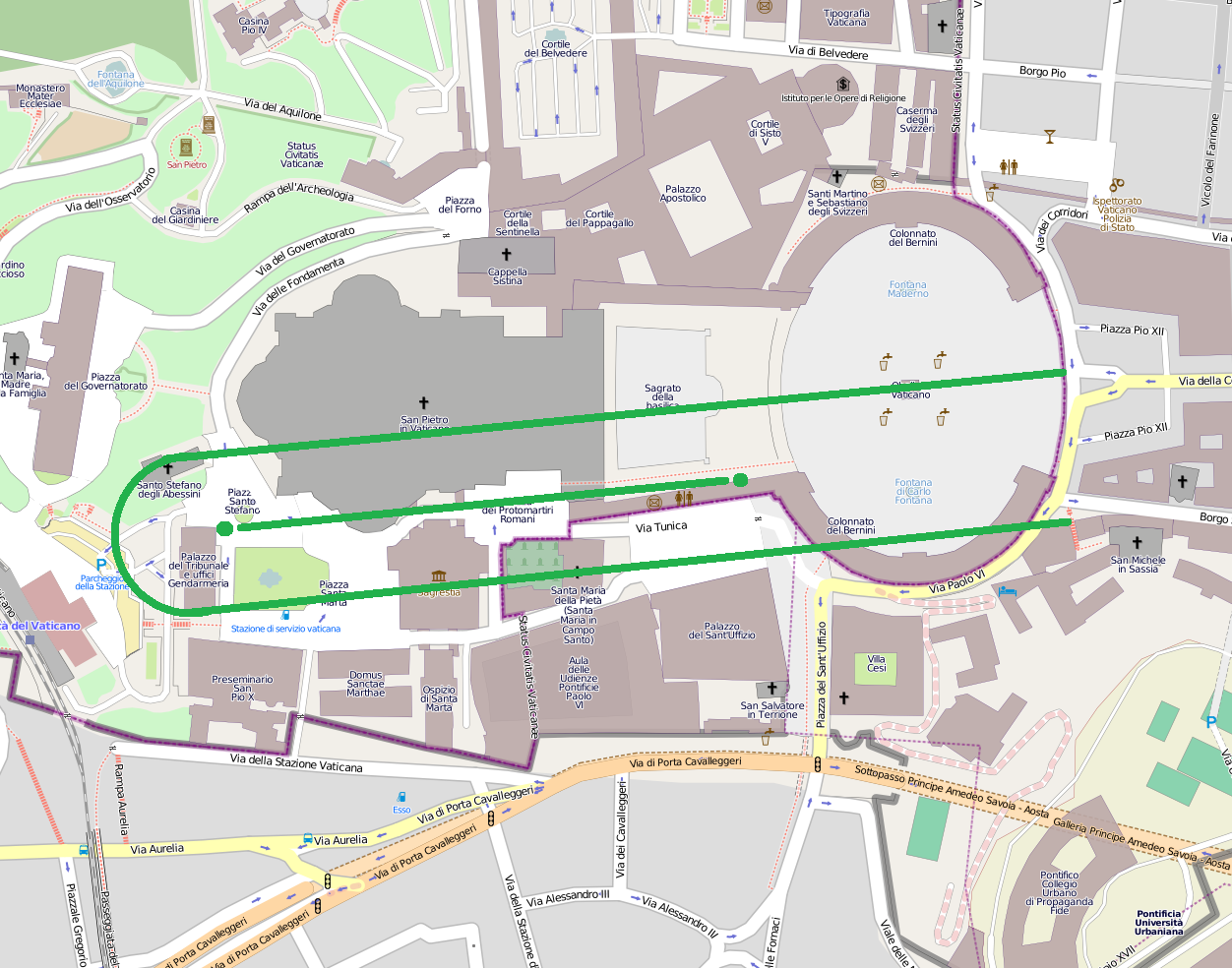
Plan

The Circus of Nero or Circus of Caligula was a circus in ancient Rome, located mostly in the present-day Vatican City.

It was first built under Caligula.

== History ==
The Ager Vaticanus, the alluvial plain outside the city walls on the west bank of the Tiber, was developed at the end of the first century BC, allowing patrician families to construct luxurious private residences (Horti). The Horti Agrippinae villa-estate belonged to Agrippina the Elder and was inherited by her son Caligula (r. 37–41 AD). He was a chariot-racing enthusiast and began construction of the circus which was completed by Claudius (r. 41–54 AD).

The privately owned circus and Horti were then inherited by Nero who made the circus public so he could invite them to cheer him on. He also used both of these to lodge Romans made homeless by the great fire of 64. The circus was used in 65 to carry out mass executions of the Christians accused as scapegoats of the fire itself. Because of this the area beyond the Tiber north of Trastevere was known as "Nero's meadows" until the end of the Middle Ages.

The circus was also the site of St. Peter's martyrdom.

The circus was abandoned by the middle of the second century AD, when the area was partitioned and given in concession to private individuals for the construction of tombs in the necropolis.

Old St. Peter's Basilica was erected by Constantine over the site using some of the existing structure of the Circus of Nero. The basilica was sited so that its apse was centred on Peter's tomb (now beneath the high altar of the current St Peter's Basilica). Most of the ruins of the Circus survived until 1450, when they were finally destroyed (along with the Old St. Peter's Basilica) for the construction of the new St. Peter's Basilica.

== Place of martyrdom ==
The circus was the site of the first organized, state-sponsored martyrdoms of Christians in 65 AD. Tradition holds that two years later, Saint Peter and many other Christians shared their fate. The circumstances were described in detail by Tacitus in a well-known passage of the Annals (xv.44).

The site for crucifixions in the Circus would have been along the spina ("spine"), as suggested by the 2nd century Acts of Peter describing the spot of his martyrdom as inter duas metas ("between the two metae or turning-posts", which would have been equidistant between the two ends of the circus). The obelisk at the centre of this circus's spina always remained standing, until it was re-erected in Saint Peter's Square in the 16th century by the architect Domenico Fontana. The obelisk was originally brought to Rome by Caligula.

== Nearby Roman cemetery ==
The Via Cornelia ran parallel with the north side of the Circus, and its course can be traced with precision, for pagan tombs have been discovered at various times along its edges. Sante Bartoli's memoirs record that when Alexander VII was building the left wing of Bernini's colonnade and the lefthand fountain, a tomb was discovered with a bas-relief above the door representing a marriage-scene ("vi era un bellissimo bassorilievo di un matrimonio antico"). Others were soon found. The best discovery, that of pagan tombs exactly on the line of St Peter's tomb, was made in the presence of Grimaldi, 9 November 1616:

On that day, I entered a square sepulchral room the ceiling of which was ornamented with designs in painted stucco. There was a medallion in the centre, with a figure in high relief. The door opened on the Via Cornelia, which was on the same level. This tomb is located under the seventh step in front of the middle door of the church. I am told that the sarcophagus now used as a fountain, in the court of the Swiss Guards, was discovered at the time of Gregory XIII in the same place, and that it contained the body of a pagan.

== See also ==
- Circus Maximus
- Index of Vatican City-related articles

Preceded by Circus of Maxentius	Landmarks of Rome; Circus of Nero	Succeeded by Colosseum
