= Corso Vittorio Emanuele II, Rome =

Street in Rome, Italy

Coordinates: 41.8969°N 12.4724°E

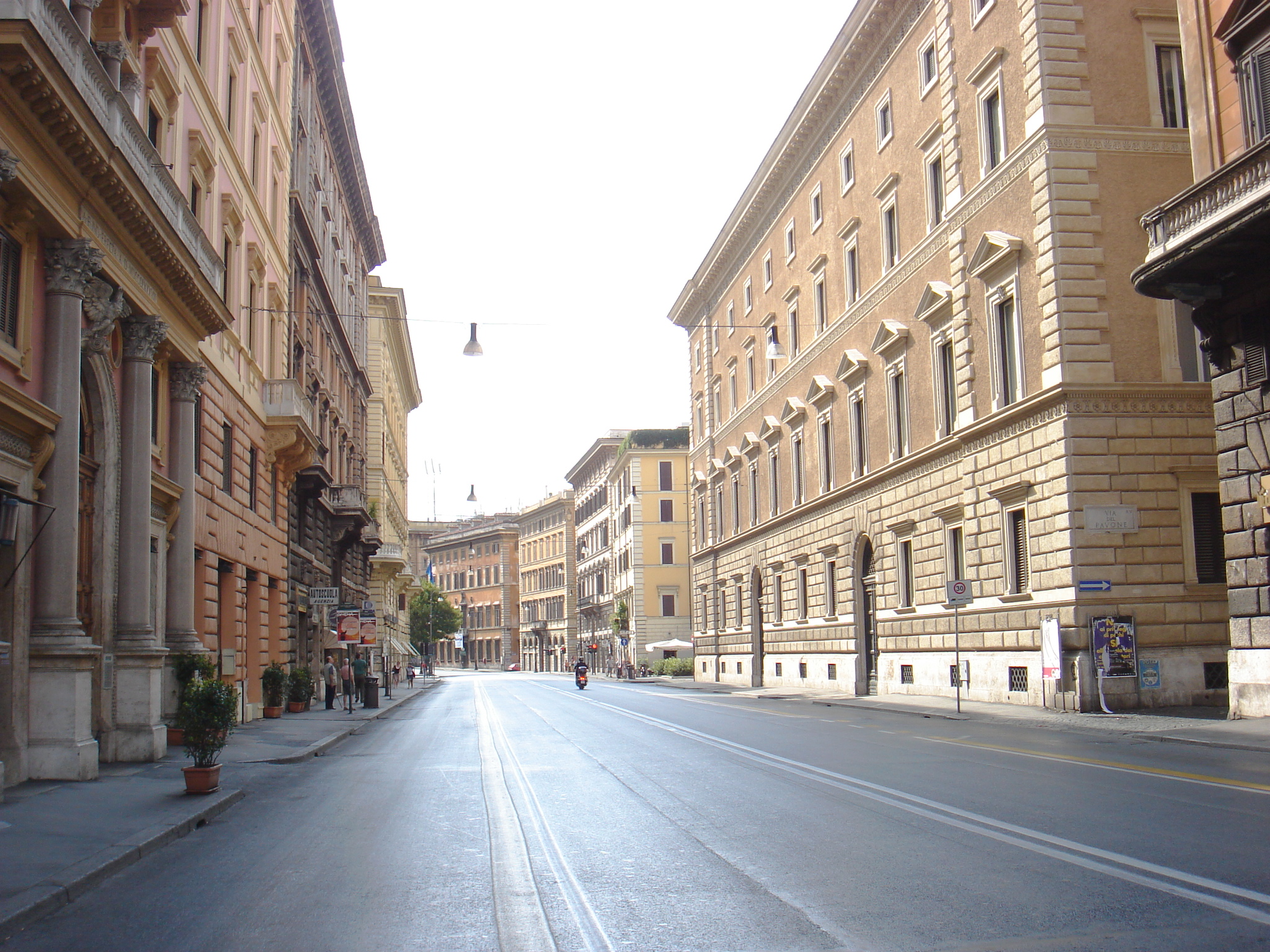
Corso Vittorio Emanuele II

Corso Vittorio Emanuele II, commonly known as Corso Vittorio, is a wide east–west thoroughfare that courses through Rome. It connects a bridge over the Tiber, Ponte Vittorio Emanuele II, to both the Via Torre Argentina and Via del Plebiscito. The latter Via continues east from Piazza del Gesù and along Palazzo Venezia to reach Piazza Venezia which sits below the massive white Monument to Vittorio Emanuele II.

In its traverse from the Tiber through central Rome, Corso Vittorio runs along the Piazza della Chiesa Nuova standing before the facade of the church of Santa Maria in Vallicella (the Chiesa Nuova), past the Palazzo della Cancelleria on the right, past the Palazzo Braschi and the Rome Commune (City Hall), and then past the curving Palazzo Massimo alle Colonne and Sant' Andrea della Valle, until it splits into two streets at Largo di Torre Argentina, where the easterly direction continues up to the Piazza of the Gesù.

It was created by a resolution of 1886 and was named after Vittorio Emanuele II, the first King of Italy.

== Palazzi ==
- Palazzo Braschi
- Palazzo Massimo alle Colonne
- Palazzo Massimo di Pirro
- Piccola Farnesina
- Palazzo Vidoni Caffarelli
- Palazzo della Valle
- Palazzo Sora
- Palazzo della Cancelleria

== Churches ==
- Santa Maria in Vallicella (the Chiesa Nuova)
- Sant' Andrea della Valle
- Gesù
- San Pantaleo

== Sources ==
- Rendina, Claudio; Paradisi, Donatella (2004). Le strade di Roma. Volume terzo P-Z. Roma: Newton Compton Editori. ISBN 88-541-0210-5.
