= Via Trionfale =

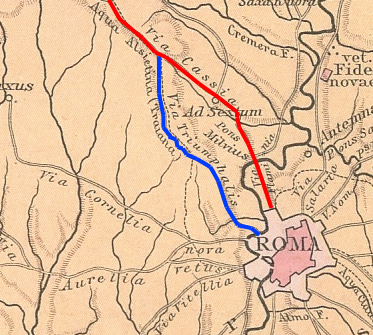
- The ancient Via Triumphalis (denoted by the lower, blue-colored line), which stretched from Rome to the Via Cassia (denoted by the top, red-colored line)

Route information
- Length: 11 km (6.8 mi)

Location
- Country: Italy

Highway system
- Roads in Italy; Autostrade; State; Regional; Provincial; Municipal

Via Trionfale is a Roman road that leads to and within Rome, Italy. Formerly called Via Triumphalis, it was an ancient consular road that connected Rome to Veii. The northern terminus of the road connects with the Via Cassia.

== History ==
The name given to the road most likely dates back to the victory of Marcus Furius Camillus over the city of Veii around 396 BC, for which was granted the right to a triumph on the road that led from Veii to the Capitoline Hill (Campidoglio Hill). Roman generals awarded a triumph traditionally proceeded from the Campus Martius to the Capitoline along this road. The route was identified during the Renaissance and described by Flavio Biondo in Roma Triumphans book X. Important ancient landmarks were the Triumphal Bridge (Pons Neronianus) over the Tiber, now demolished, the Triumphal Gate (Porta Triumphalis), the Arch of Arcadius, Honorius, and Theodosius, and the termination of the route at the Temple of Janus Quadrifrons.

The 1828 book A Tour in Italy and Sicily noted that Via Trionfale was "only eight feet wide and completely arched over with trees" around that time period. The book also noted that the road was "paved with stones two or three feet in diameter, irregular, yet closely fitted together, and so deep set in the ground as to now be in perfect order after the lapse of so many centuries." At that time, it was also noted that some of the stones had the initials "V.N." carved into them, which stands for "via numinis".

== Today ==
The current route is about 11 kilometres (6.8 mi). It is typically very busy during the day, particularly on areas of the road that only have one lane on each side. In September 2010, the doubling of the carriageway, two lanes in each direction, was completed between the northern entrance of the Agostino Gemelli polyclinic and the Forte Trionfale.

On January 23, 2007, the ramps of the Via Trionfale junction were inaugurated with the Grande Raccordo Anulare (in the Ottavia area). The junction was completely opened to traffic around January 2009.

== Historical landmarks ==
The Fontana di Piazza Pia exists on the route. The fountain was constructed in 1862 by Pope Pius IX, replacing an earlier fountain by Pope Paul V from 1614. The fountain was designed by Filippo Martinucci. It has now been obscured from view due to the raising and widening of the Via Trionfale.
