= Ghezzi =

Ghezzi is an Italian surname.

== Geographical distribution ==
As of 2014, 84.5% of all known bearers of the surname Ghezzi were residents of Italy (frequency 1:4,372), 4.9% of Argentina (1:52,705), 3.2% of the United States (1:679,044), 2.0% of France (1:204,011), 1.5% of Switzerland (1:33,113) and 1.3% of Brazil (1:917,095).

In Italy, the frequency of the surname was higher than the national average (1:4,372) in the following regions:

1. Lombardy (1:996)
2. Trentino-Alto Adige/Südtirol (1:2,297)
3. Tuscany (1:2,705)
4. Emilia-Romagna (1:3,927)

== People ==
- Andrea Ghezzi (born 2001), Italian footballer
- Carlo Ghezzi, Italian academic
- Dori Ghezzi (born 1946), Italian singer
- Enrico Ghezzi (born 1952), Italian film critic and writer
- Gioia Ghezzi (born 1962), Italian manager
- Giorgio Ghezzi (1930–1990), Italian soccer player
- Giuseppe Ghezzi (1634–1721), Italian painter
- Ippolito Ghezzi (1650–1709), Italian composer and Augustinian friar
- John J. Ghezzi (1911–1938), American lawyer
- Luca Ghezzi (born 1978), Italian rower
- Maria Ghezzi (1927–2021), Italian designer, illustrator, and painter
- Pier Leone Ghezzi (1674–1755), Italian painter
- Sebastiano Ghezzi (1580–1645), Italian painter
- Vic Ghezzi (1910–1976), American golfer

== See also ==
- Ghezzi & Brian, an Italian motorcycle company
