= Glory of Sant'Andrea Avellino =

Painting by Giovanni Lanfranco

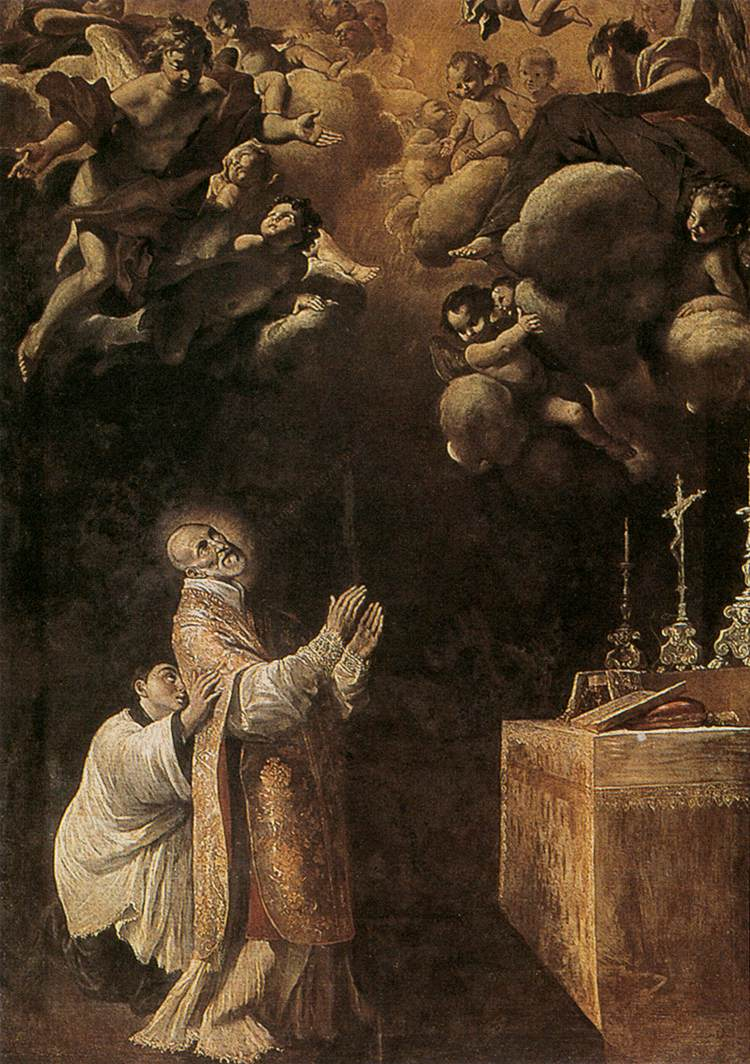
- Artist: Giovanni Lanfranco (and Antonio Amorosi)
- Year: 1624
- Medium: Oil on canvas
- Dimensions: 320 cm × 420 cm (130 in × 170 in)
- Location: Sant'Andrea della Valle; Rome

The Glory of Sant'Andrea Avellino is a painting by the Italian Baroque painter Giovanni Lanfranco, executed in 1624. It is the main altarpiece of the chapel of Sant'Andrea Avellino in the church of Sant'Andrea della Valle in Rome, Italy.

== Description ==
The painting depicts events on 10 November 1608 just before the death of the priest and Theatine preacher Andrea Avellino. As he began to celebrate the miracle of the Eucharist, he was stricken with apoplexy (stroke) and would soon after die. The depiction shows an assistant aiding him to stand as the heavens and angels open up above, prefiguring his sanctity. The depiction of the lower figures were completed by Lanfranco putatively in 8 days in order to be complete for his beatification by Pope Urban VIII in 1624. It is stated that the glory of angels were added in the mid-1600s by Antonio Amorosi. The canvas originally was taller, and the superior arch of it was detached in the 19th century when the altar was rebuilt.

It remains unclear what the painting completed only by Lanfranco depicted. Ultimately, the addition of the heavens above asserts the posthumous inclusion of Avellino, the second most prominent Theatine preacher, among the blessed. The drama of the moment is also meant to underscore the value of the Catholic mass to the heavens.
