= Pier Leone Ghezzi =

Italian painter

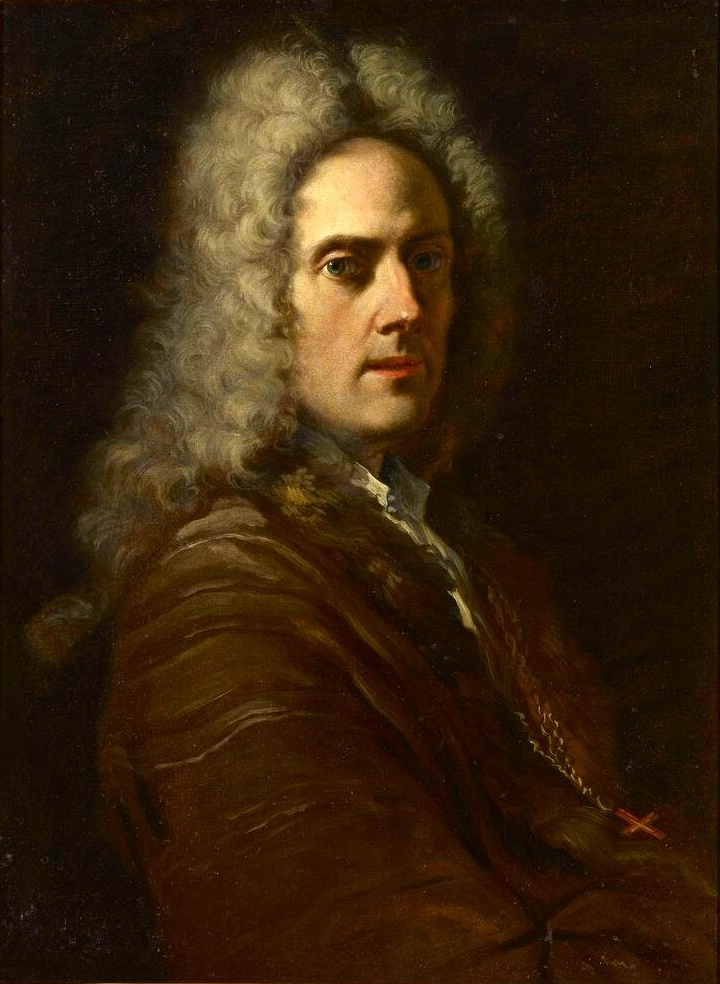
- Pier Leone Ghezzi, Self-portrait, Musée Fesch, Ajaccio.
- Born: 28 June 1674; Rome, Papal States
- Died: 6 March 1755 (aged 80); Rome, Papal States
- Resting place: San Salvatore in Lauro, Rome
- Education: Giuseppe Ghezzi
- Known for: Painter, engraver, satirist
- Movement: Rococo

Signature
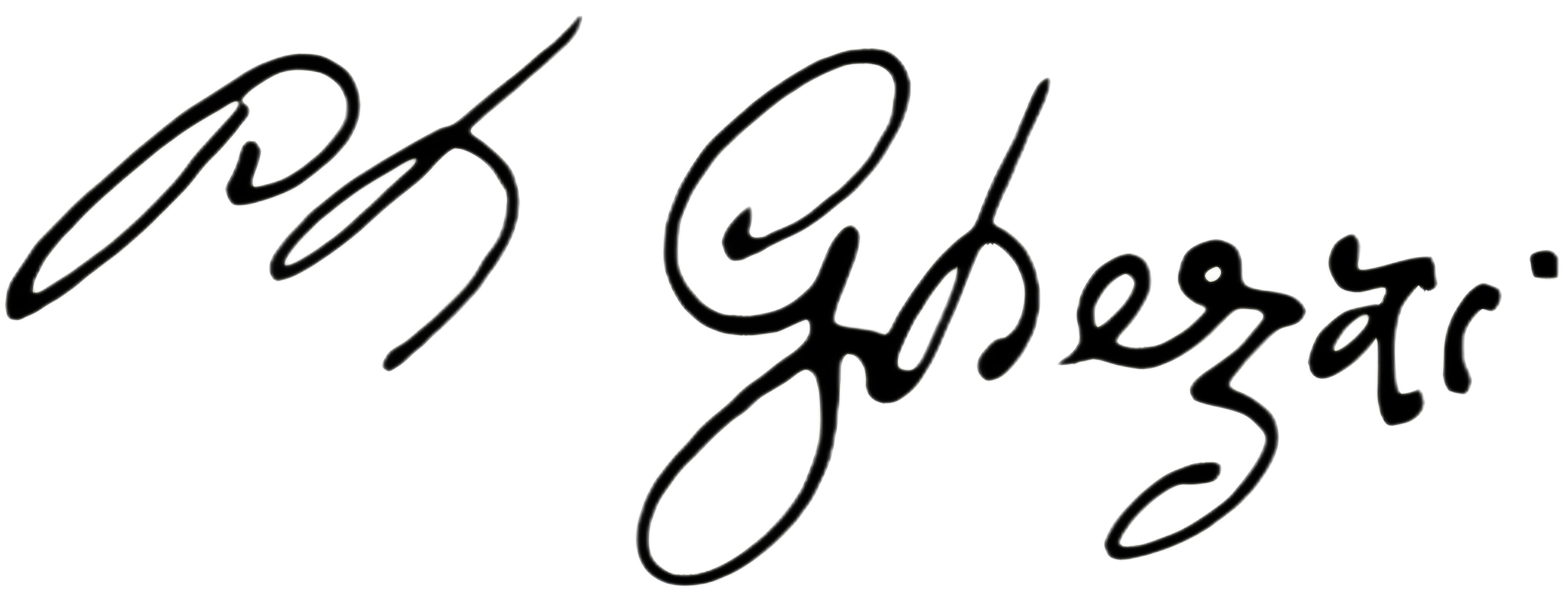

Pier Leone Ghezzi (28 June 1674 – 6 March 1755) was an Italian Rococo painter, draughtsman, printmaker and caricaturist who was mainly active in Rome. While he painted decorative frescoes and created a new type of anecdotal and realistic history painting, he is now mainly known for his caricatures of famous people of his time. He has been described as the first professional caricaturist. In his countless portrait drawings, he was able to capture the essence of the sitter with only a few strokes. He regularly portrayed a single figure with exaggerated anatomy and various eccentricities of clothing and posture. In group portraits he created a humoristic effect by repeating a strange stance or expression.

== Biography ==
=== Early life and education ===
Ghezzi was born in Rome on 28 June 1674 as the son of Giuseppe and Lucia Laraschi. He was baptized on 9 July in the church of San Giovanni dei Fiorentini with Carlo Maratta acting as his godfather. He came from a prominent family of artists: his grandfather Sebastiano Ghezzi was a painter and architect for Pope Urban VIII and his father was a Baroque painter contributing altarpieces in many churches in Rome. He was trained by his father in a cultural environment dominated by the Roman classical tradition, as represented most notably in the art of Carlo Maratta, Giovanni Battista Gaulli and Pietro da Cortona. His father was secretary of the Accademia di San Luca, the academy of artists in Rome.

=== Religious works, history paintings and decorative frescoes ===
Pier Leone Ghezzi's first documented work is the signed and dated Landscape with Saint Francis (1698; Montefortino, Pinacoteca Civica). Very close to this date he collaborated with Antonio Amorosi, a student of his father, on the Virgin of Loreto for the church of Santa Caterina at Comunanza. In 1705 Ghezzi was elected Accademico di Merito at the Accademia di San Luca. His essay painting, the Allegory of Gratitude, was donated to the institution for his admission, as was customary.

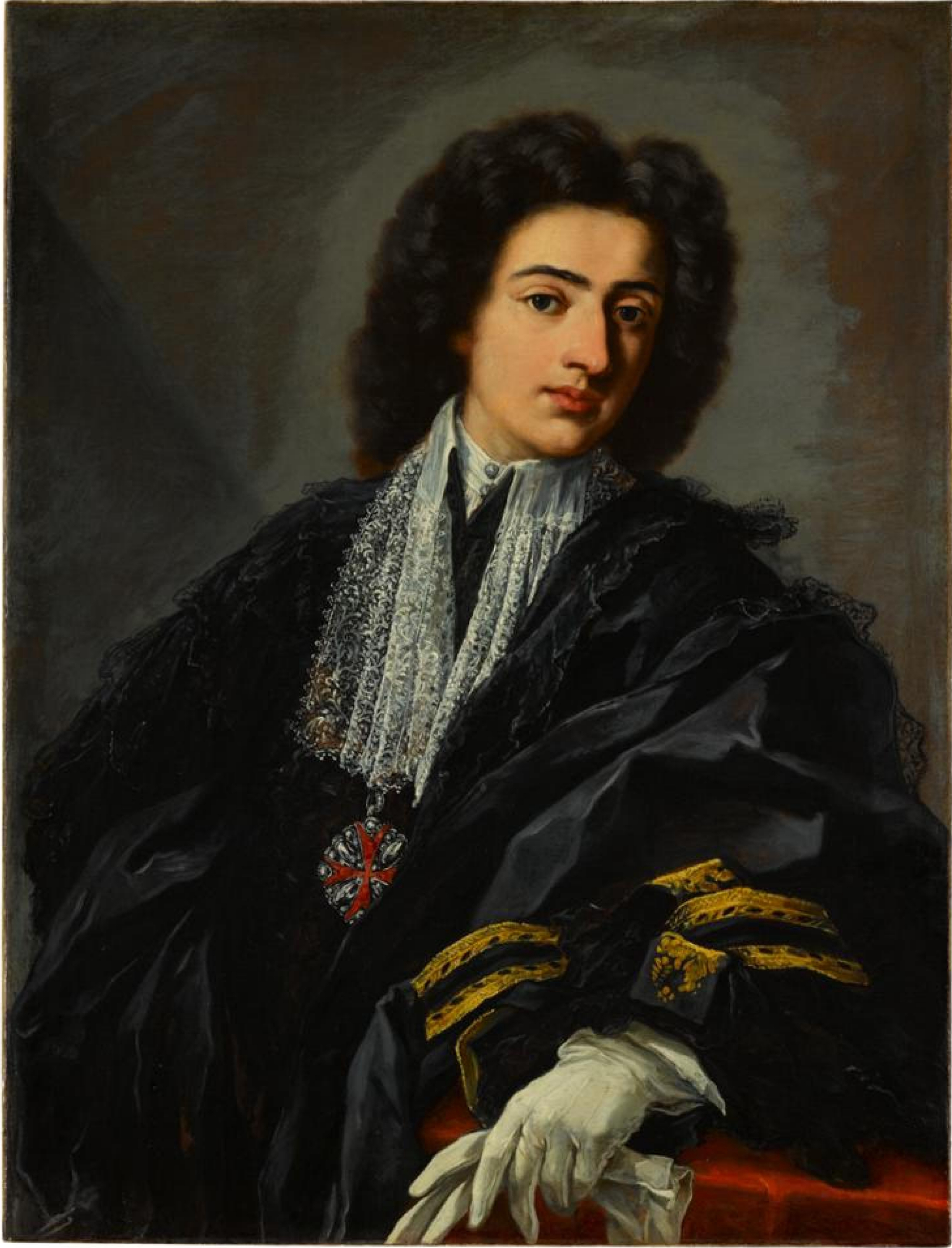
Portrait of Carlo Albani, 1st Prince of Soriano nel Cimino

In 1708, he was appointed painter to the Camera Apostolica by Pope Clement XI. This position involved him acting as curator of the papal collections, superintending the decorations for ceremonial occasions and the manufacture of tapestries and mosaics, and overseeing architectural sites and the decoration of buildings. In 1710 Francesco Farnese, Duke of Parma awarded him the cross of a knight. He was also a member of the Academy of Arcadia.

Ghezzi's most important official commissions date from between 1712 and 1721. Six large canvases of scenes from the Life of Clement XI (1712–15; Urbino, Ducal Palace), painted for the salone of the papal palace at Castel Gandolfo brought to history painting a new informality and documentary realism. They are characterized by a naturalistic description of setting and figures, and by a lively interest in anecdote. In contrast, the Election of Saint Fabian (c. 1712) for the Albani Chapel in San Sebastiano fuori le Mura, Rome, and the frescoed Martyrdom of Saint Ignatius of Antioch (c. 1716) over the nave arcade in San Clemente, Rome, remain within the academic tradition, with an emphasis on dramatic gesture and a theatrically Baroque treatment of space.

The most important artistic enterprise of Clement XI's reign was the rebuilding and redecoration of the archbasilica of Saint John Lateran, Rome, to which Ghezzi contributed a highly academic oval canvas of the Prophet Micah (1718) as one of a series of 12 paintings for the nave.

After the death of Pope Clement XI in 1721, the Falconieri family, especially Alessandro (made cardinal in 1724), became Ghezzi's chief patrons. In these years he also developed contacts with French culture, through the French Academy in Rome, and through Cardinal Melchior de Polignac, French ambassador to the Holy See, who became his patron and friend. He collaborated with Giovanni Paolo Panini, who encouraged a new interest in the picturesque; together they designed the theatrical displays mounted by the French Academy in Rome to celebrate the birth of the Dauphin of France in 1729.

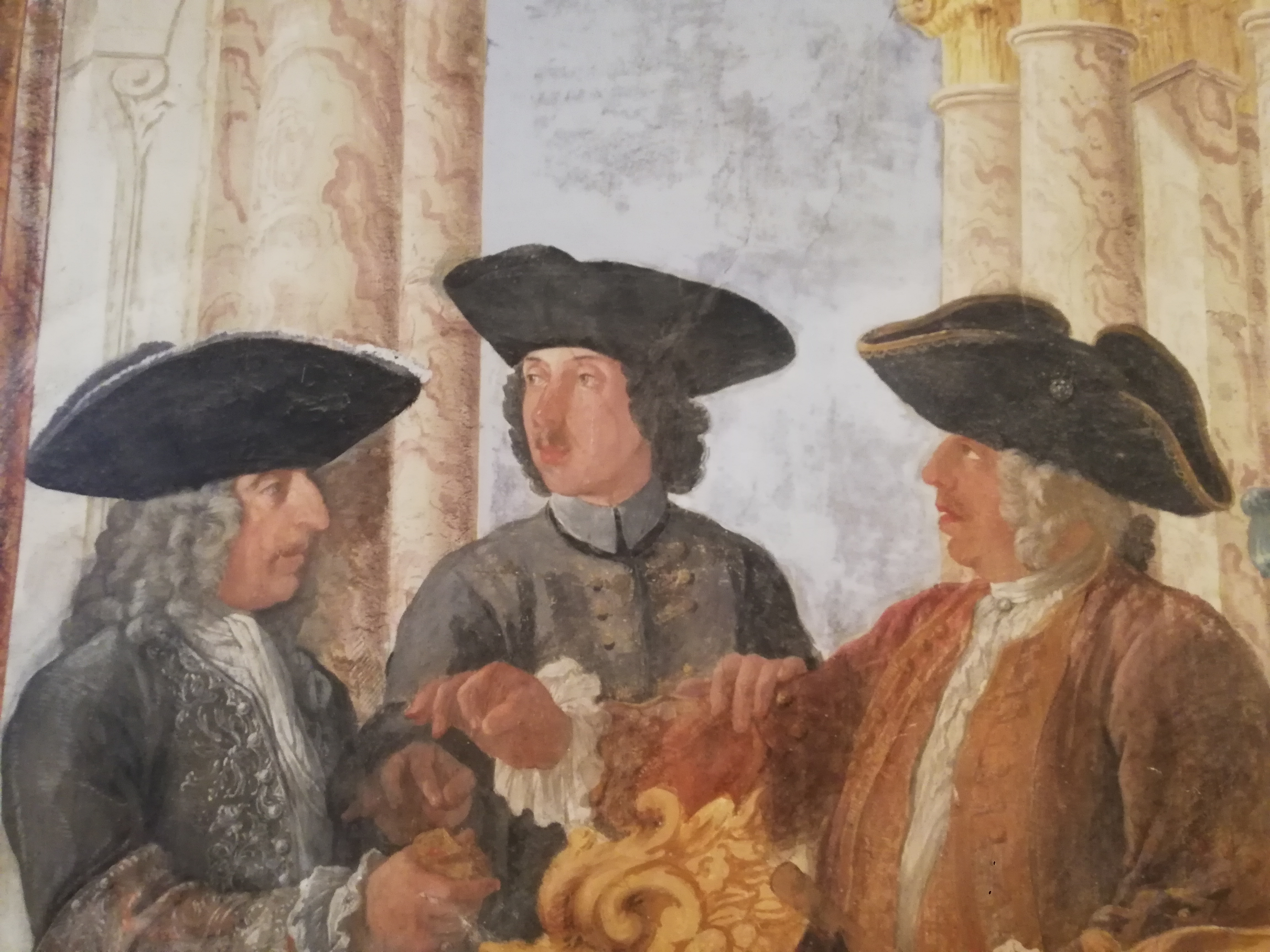
Portraits of members of the Falconieri family, Villa Falconieri

For Alessandro Falconieri, Ghezzi painted decorative fresco cycles, in the castle of Torrimpietra (1712–32) and in the Villa Falconieri at Frascati (1724–34). At the castle, in 1725, he decorated the salone with Benedict XIIIs Visit to the Torrimpietra, and the adjacent small chapel with the Death of Saint Giuliana Falconieri. Two further rooms were decorated with the Falconieri Family Taking a Country Walk and the Flight into Egypt. The perspective views and landscape backgrounds are by Francesco Ignazio Borgognone and suggest that the ideal happiness of villa life is reflected by an idyllic natural world. The figures are fashionably dressed, and for the most part drawn from life, conveying Ghezzi's interest in narrative and witty allusion.

In 1725 Cardinal Falconieri restored the chapel of San Filippo Benizi in San Marcello, Rome, to which Ghezzi contributed an altarpiece, in an academic style, of Saint Filippo Benizi Presenting Saints Alessio Falconieri and Giuliana Falconieri to the Virgin. In the Villa Falconieri at Frascati landscape became a dominant theme. In the Stanza della Ringhiera, on the first floor, Ghezzi painted a panoramic Landscape with Six Figures in light and airy colours. In 1727 he decorated a room on the ground-floor with a series of wittily observed family portraits, showing the figures strolling or conversing in an illusionistic colonnade. An apartment on the first floor is decorated with scenes of outdoor life with small, almost caricatured figures.

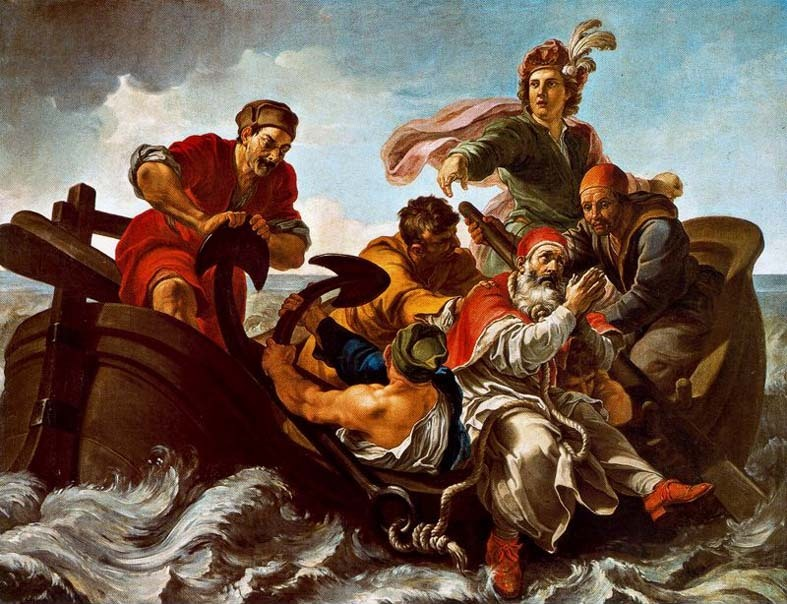
The martyrdom of pope Saint Clement, Rome, Vatican Museums

In the same period, and revealing his inclination for theatrical settings, Ghezzi painted the Return of the Prodigal Son (Minneapolis, Minneapolis Institute of Art) and the Lateran Council (1725; Raleigh, North Carolina Museum of Art). The Cardinal Vincenzo Maria Orsini rescued from the debris of an earthquake by the miraculous intervention of St Philip Neri (A version in Rome: 1624-26, Santa Maria in Vallicella painted for Cardinal Orsini, by then Pope Benedict XIII and a larger version in Matelica: c. 1728, San Filippo). Though incorporating academic figures, it retains an emphasis on precise descriptive realism and employs bright and vivid colours. The Martyrdom of pope Saint Clement and Saint Clement and the Lamb (both Vatican Museums in Rome) were painted in 1728, and in 1731 Ghezzi painted Saint Emygdius and other Saints from the Marches for San Salvatore in Lauro in Rome. This is an unusual composition, in which a circle of peasant-like saints, floating in midair, crowd around the standing Saint Emygdius, whose arm is raised in benediction. Ghezzi's last work on a religious theme is the highly naturalistic Saint Giuliana Falconieri between Saints Filippo Benizi and Alessio Falconieri, commissioned by Pope Clement XII for Santa Maria dell'Orazione e Morte, Rome (1737).

Ghezzi's last great decorative project is the cycle of wall paintings in tempera of Landscape Views, painted for the gallery of the Papal Palace of Castel Gandolfo (1747). Here the landscape is the principal theme and reflects his connections with such distinguished Jansenists as Cardinal Domenico Silvio Passionei, who believed that in nature the soul could recapture its lost purity.

In his final years Ghezzi accepted no further commissions for history painting, being by then much involved in the study of the Antique. An exception, however, was the small, privately commissioned Diogenes before Alexander (1725–31; Rome, priv. col.) for the antiquarian Philipp von Stosch, who shared his scholarly interest in antiquity.

=== Portrait painting ===
Ghezzi painted portraits throughout his life, even after he had ceased to accept commissions for history and decorative paintings. His portraits were mainly of members of the Roman Curia, of men associated with the Accademia di San Luca or of distinguished members of the French community in Rome. They constitute his most representative work, and introduce a new directness and informality into portraiture. The paintings are comparatively small, executed in rapid and free brushstrokes and conveying the sitter's character and state of mind. The portraits before 1720, although based on the Roman models of Maratta and on the painterly works of Gaulli and Passeri, became increasingly spontaneous, intimate and intense. Examples include a Self-portrait (c. 1702; Florence, Uffizi) and the elegant and intimate portrait of the Pope's nephew, Carlo Albani (c. 1705; Staatsgalerie Stuttgart), which demonstrates Ghezzi's delicate interpretation of character and his anticipation of the Rococo.

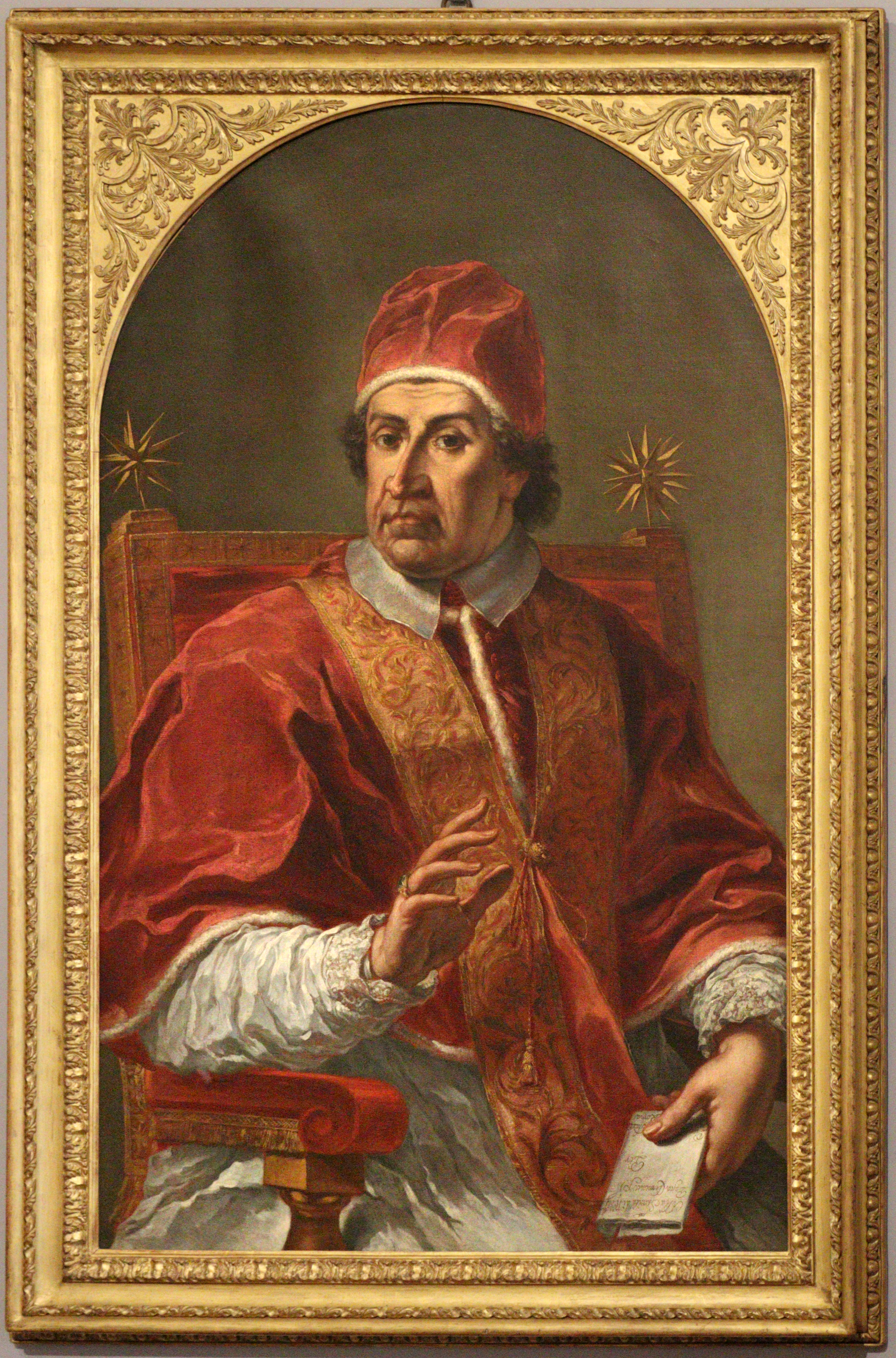
Portrait of Pope Clement XI (c. 1708)

The naturalistic and warmly coloured portrait of Pope Clement XI (Rome, Palazzo Braschi) is datable to between 1708 and 1712. In the portrait of Cardinal Annibale Albani (c. 1712; Milan, priv. col.), he moved towards more decorative and expressive contrasts of light and shade; the Self-portrait (Florence, Uffizi) of 1719 is a highly personal, lyrical work, in which Ghezzi emphasizes his rank of Cavaliere. Other of Ghezzi's portraits from between 1710 and 1720 include the portraits of Benedetto Falconcini (Worcester Art Museum) and Pompeo Aldrovandi (Bologna, Biblioteca Universitaria), which are distinguished by their use of a close viewpoint and by their psychological power.

From 1720 Ghezzi responded to the new Rococo style of Benedetto Luti, Sebastiano Conca and Panini. His works became less dramatic, and he created a quieter naturalism and more luminous tones. In this he was influenced by French portraitists in Rome, an influence particularly apparent in the portraits included in the frescoes for the Falconieri family in their villa at Frascati. The new transparency of his colour is particularly indebted to the portraits of Pierre Subleyras. The Self-portrait (Florence, Uffizi) of 1725 is close in style to the works of William Hogarth. The Portrait of a Lady as a Shepherdess (Rome, Lemme priv. col.), suggestive of Arcadian Rome, and the portrait of an Augustinian Nun (Toledo Museum of Art) date from the end of the 1720s. The elegant and romantic portrait of the sculptor Edmé Bouchardon (Florence, Uffizi) dates from 1732, and in the 1740s Ghezzi painted the Portrait of a Gentleman (Rome, priv. col.), which has an aura of French sophistication. The Self-portrait (1747; Rome, Accademia Nazionale di San Luca) is a noble and idealized work that retains none of his earlier interest in realism.

=== Drawings ===
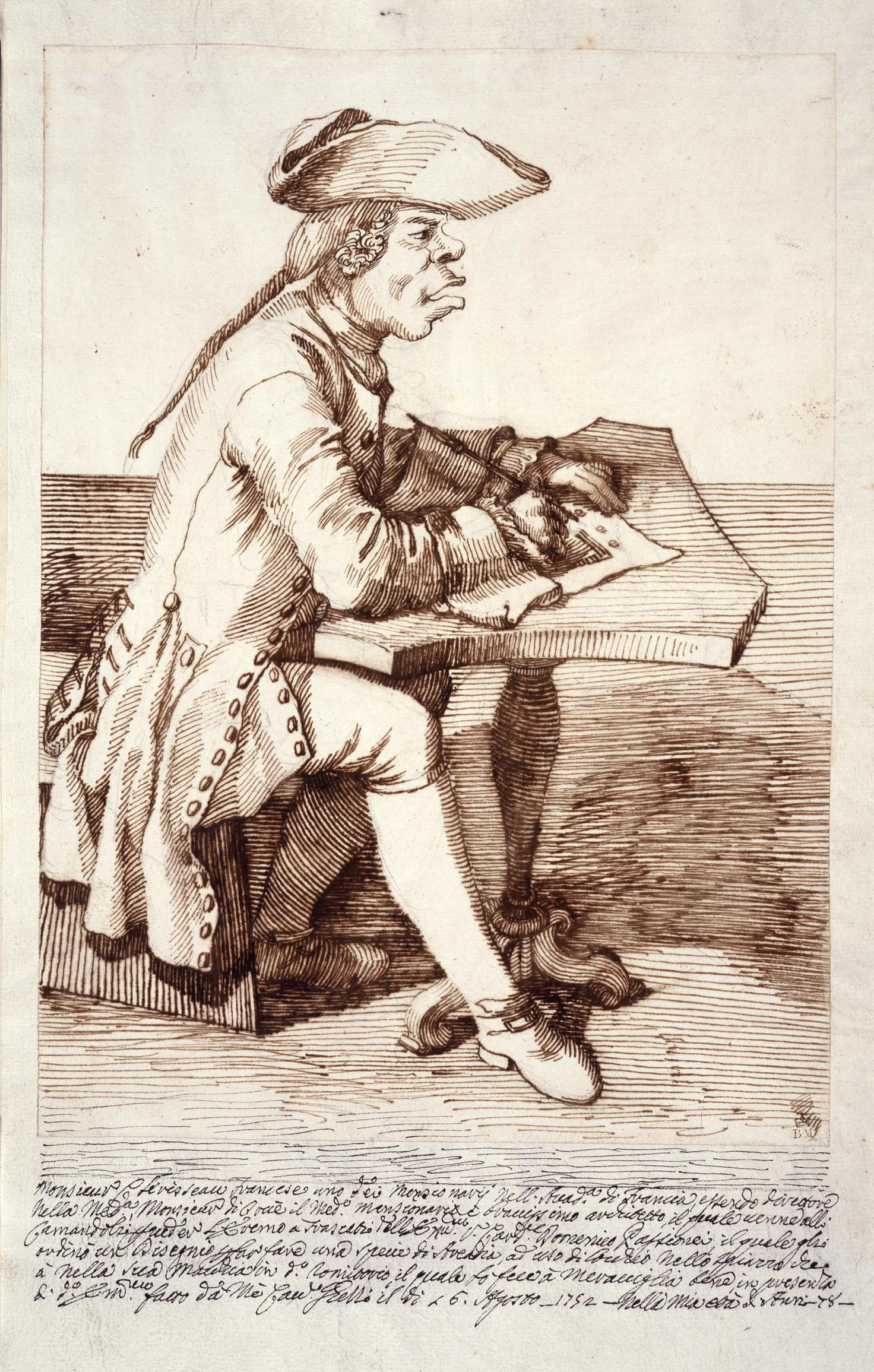
Caricature of Charles-Louis Clérisseau (1752), British Museum

Ghezzi is best known today for his caricatures. He was possibly the first professional caricaturist and produced thousands of drawings throughout his lifetime. His pen and gouache caricatures are much freer in emotion than his state portraiture, and were much admired. They often depict named individuals or professions in satirical fashion. The earliest caricatures date from 1693 and were collected by the artist himself, after 1730, in several volumes, entitled Mondo nuovo (Rome, Vatican, Vatican Library, MSS Ott. 3112–19). The intention of these caricatures was not sarcastic or subversive and entailed no moral judgement. He depicted the aristocrats, artists and churchmen who protected him and were his patrons, and who formed the society in which he gained such success. His talent lay in his ability to capture the essential features of a sitter with a few rapid strokes of the pen and watercolour and, without malice, to create comic characters.

Also in the Vatican Library, from the Guglielmi collection, are other caricatures from Ghezzi's early career, dating from c. 1702. These comprise portraits of members of Roman society, scenes from the Commedia dell'arte and popular scenes, such as the Capuchin Friar and the Charming Lady (c. 1702). Ghezzi, rooted in a cultivated and aristocratic milieu, showed little interest in the world of the poor. The series entitled Pulcinella is particularly beautiful. His caricatures from after 1721 were executed in series with a documentary, rather than a comic, purpose, and are less successful than the lively and spontaneous creations of his youth. Some of these later caricatures (1749–52) are bound into a volume (Rome, Gabinetto Nazionale delle Stampe, Cod. 2606).

From 1720 Ghezzi also made many drawings after the Antique—cameos, coins and vases—bearing witness to the contemporary interest in archaeology, restoration and collecting. The most famous volumes of such drawings are: one in the British Museum, London, with drawings made for Passionei and Stosch between 1740 and 1750; the volumes in the Ottoboniano Foundation (Rome, Vatican Library, MSS 3100–10); and the Manoscritto Lanciani (Rome, Biblioteca di archeologia e storia dell'arte). He was also commissioned by Cardinal Annibale Albani in 1726 to make drawings for the Roman Pontifical and for the Vita del Papa Clement XI. These are now known only through engravings executed in a highly finished, clear style, which emphasizes their didactic purpose. In addition to his drawings, Ghezzi also left a diary (Rome, Biblioteca Casanatense, MS. 3765), which survives only in part, and contains interesting notes on the life and society of Rome between 1731 and 1734.

== Gallery ==
Paintings

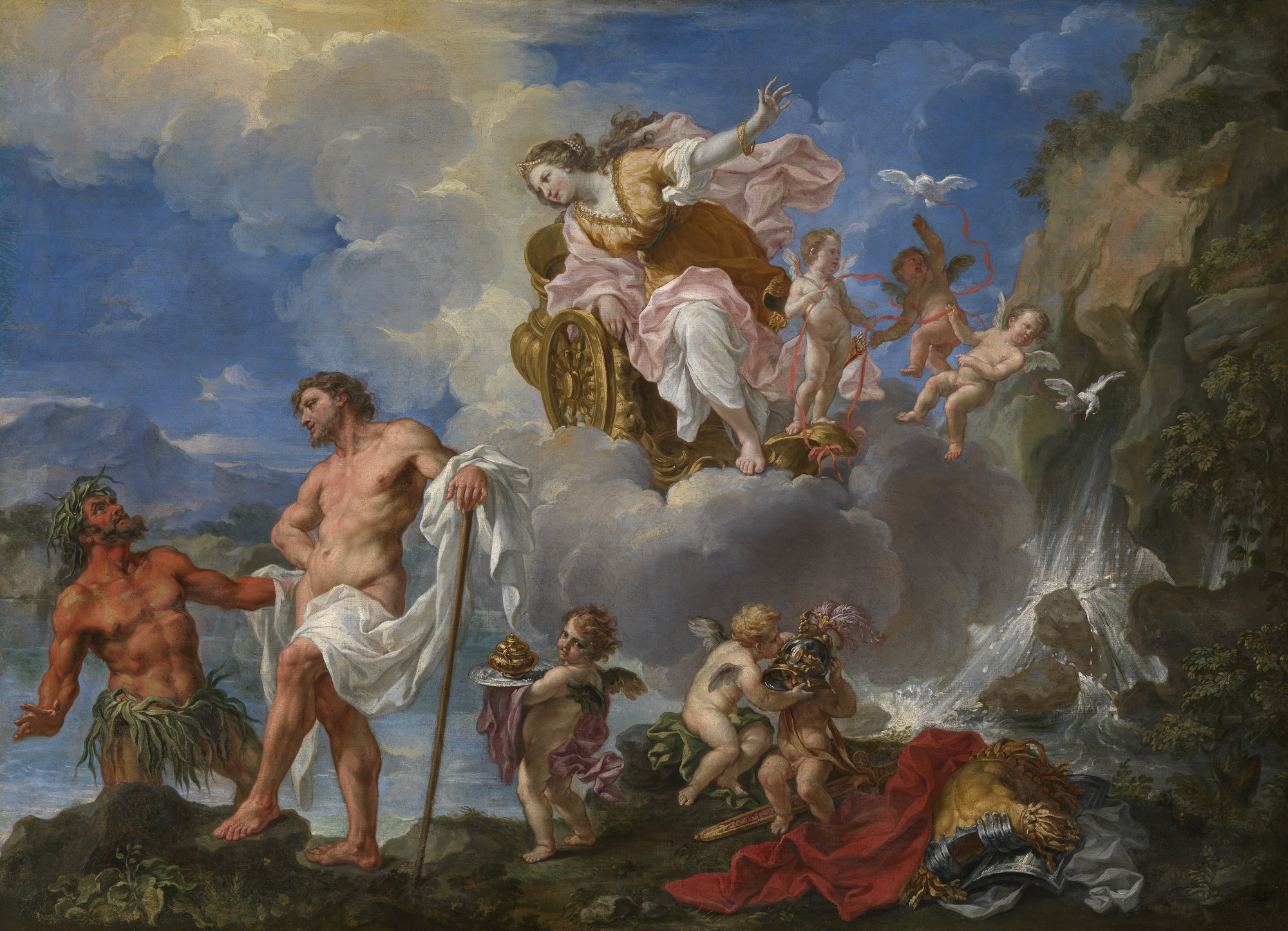
The Purification of Aeneas in the River Numicius, Kelvingrove Art Gallery and Museum, c. 1725

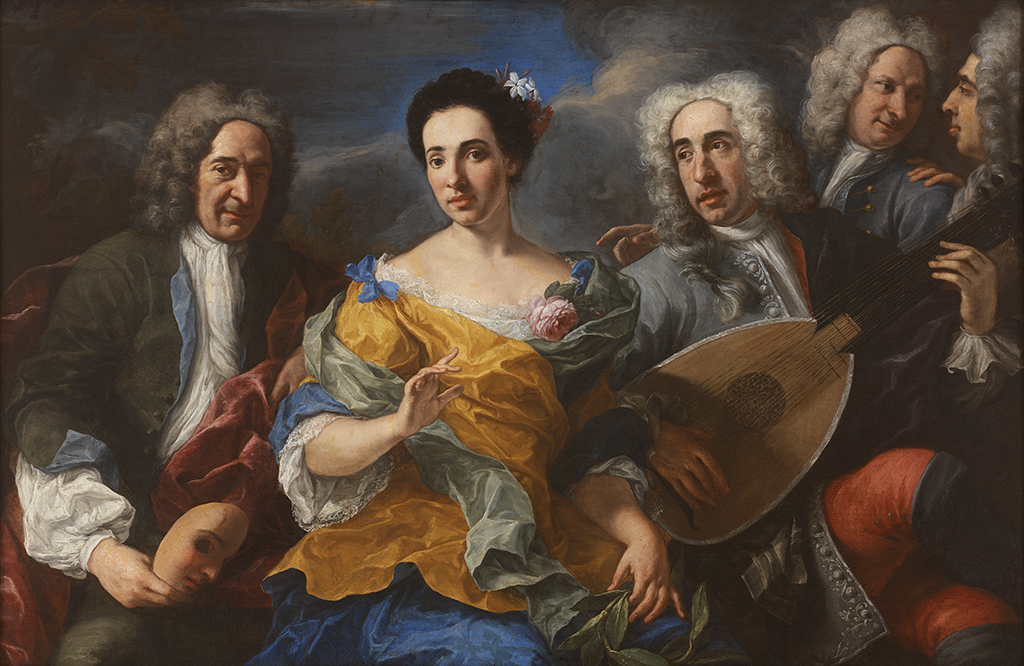
A Musical Group, c. 1730, Rhode Island School of Design Museum, Providence, Rhode Island

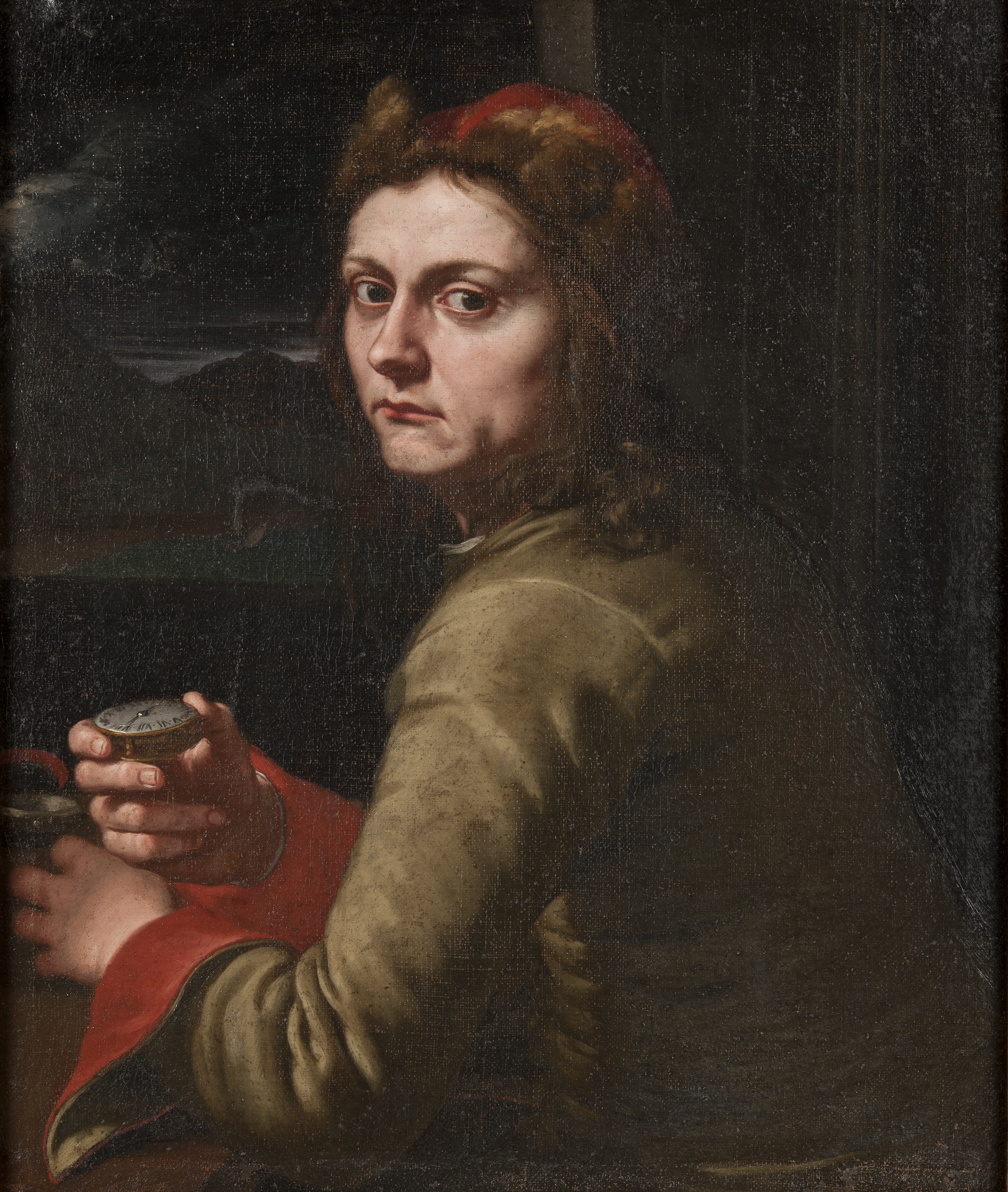
Portrait of a Watchmaker, c. 1708, Nationalmuseum

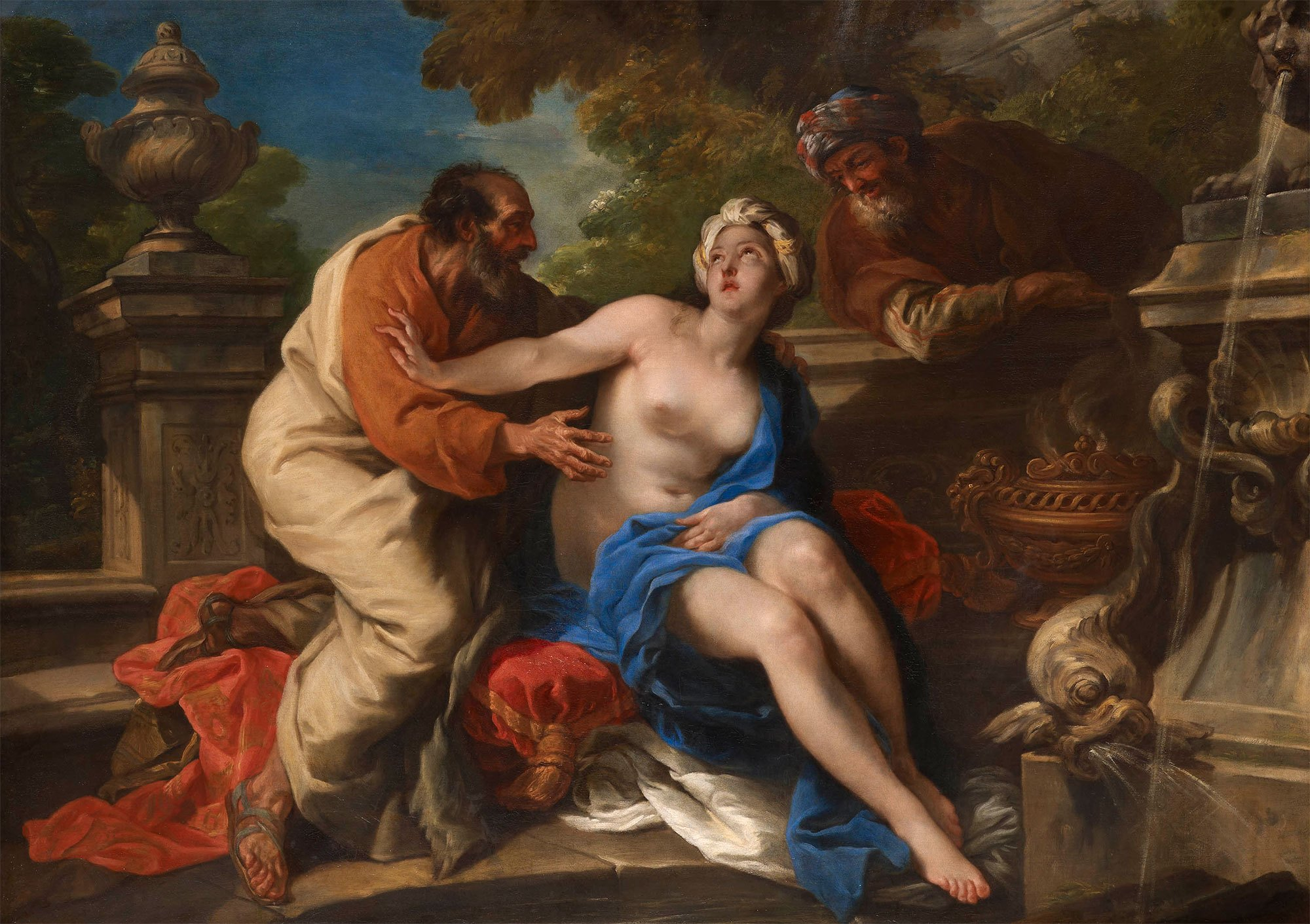
Susannah and the Elders, private collection

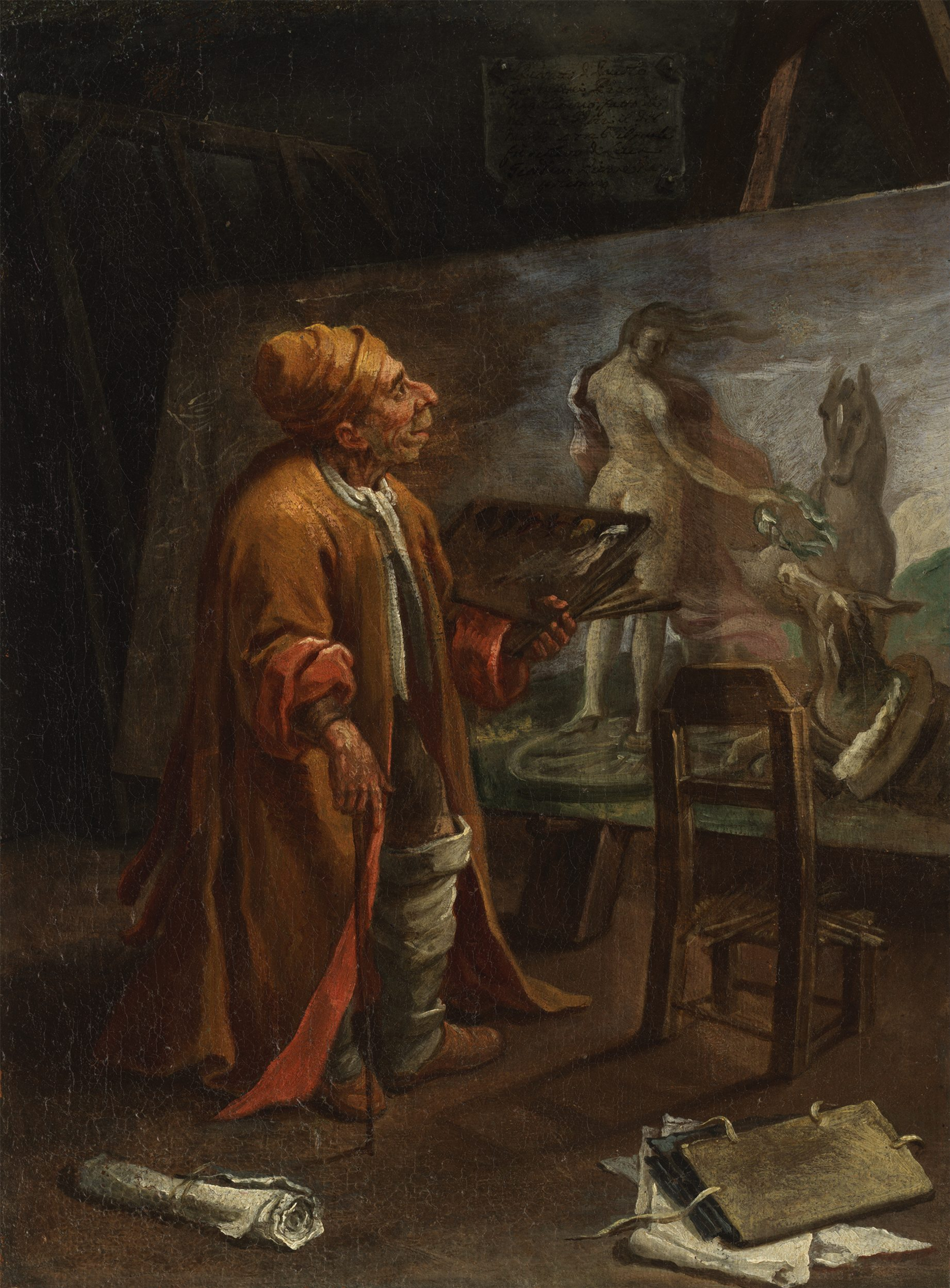
Paolo de Matteis in his Studio, 1632

Caricatures

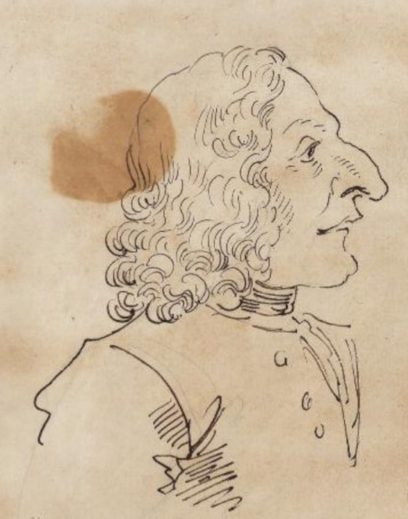
Caricature of composer Antonio Vivaldi

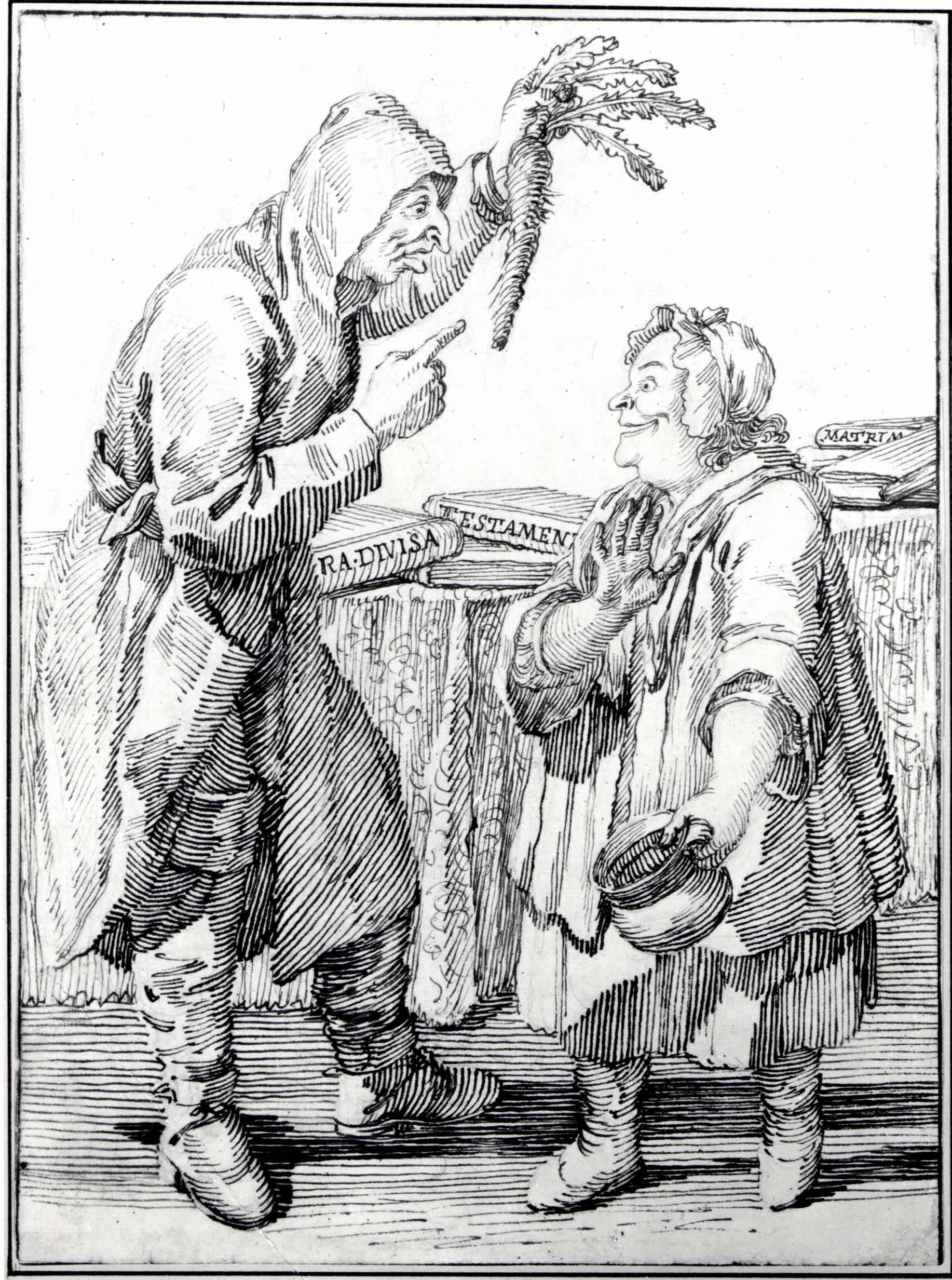
Monk with a Carrot and a Woman with a Chamber Pot

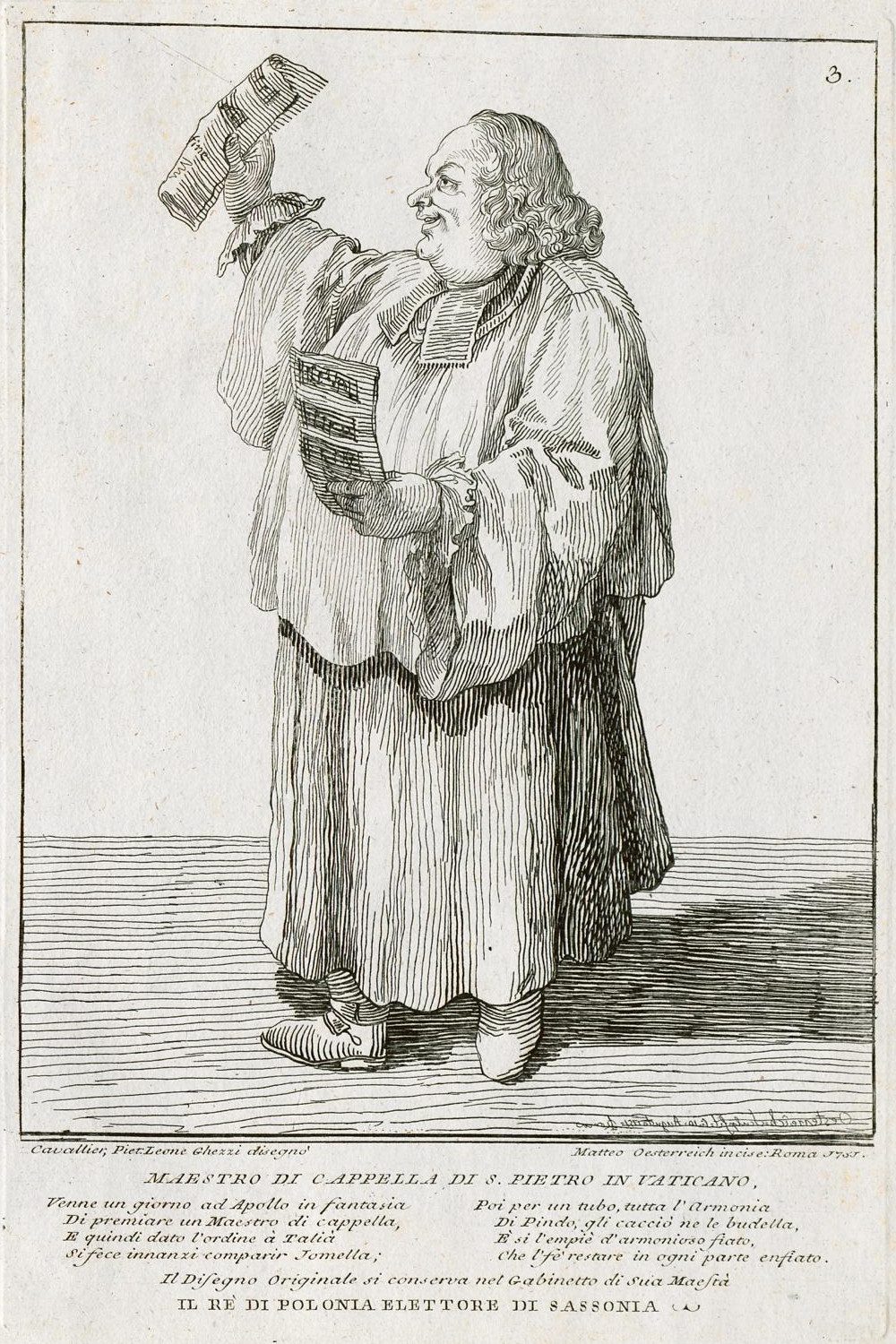
Caricature of composer Niccolò Jommelli

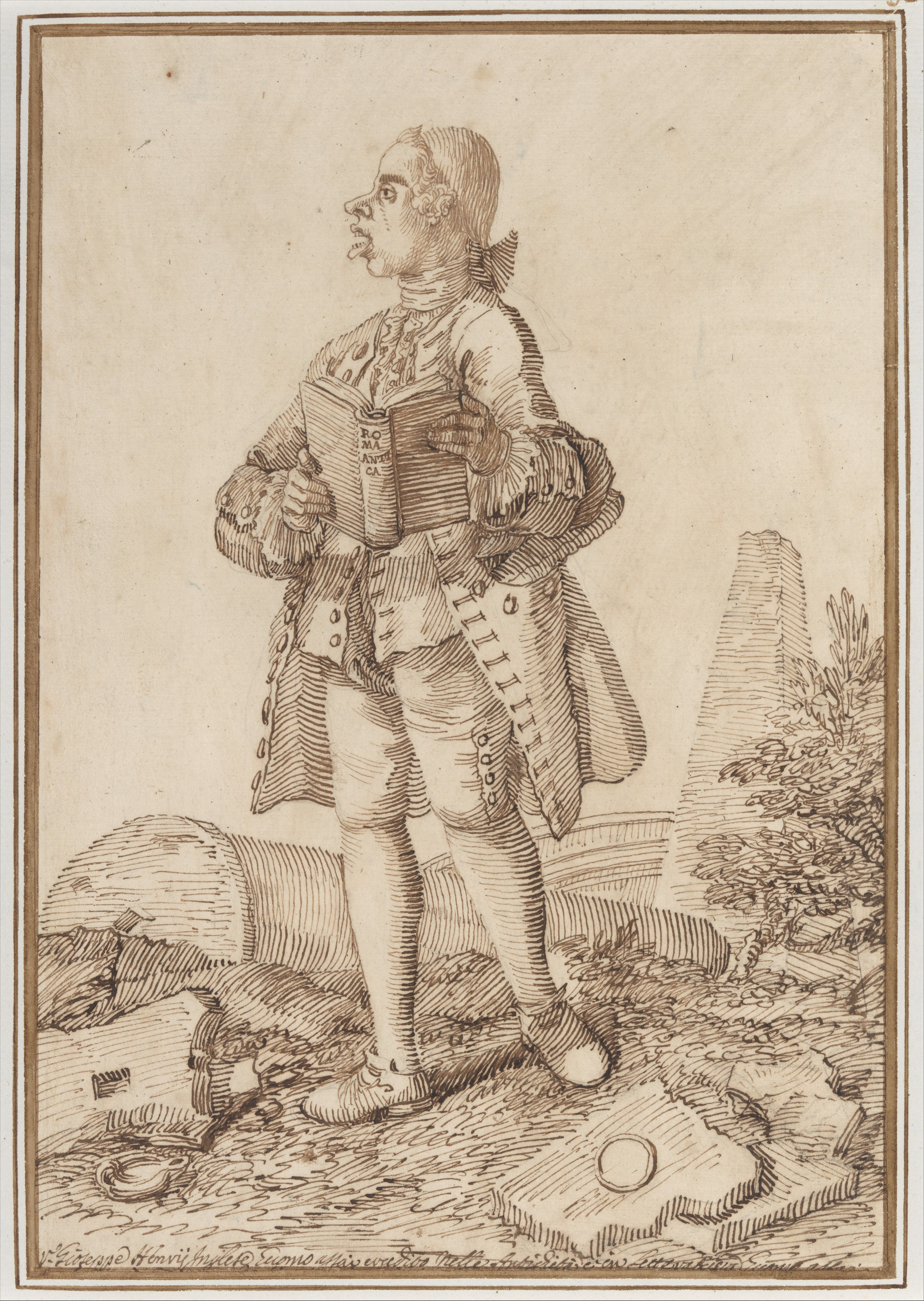
Caricature of the Irish connoisseur Joseph Henry of Straffan

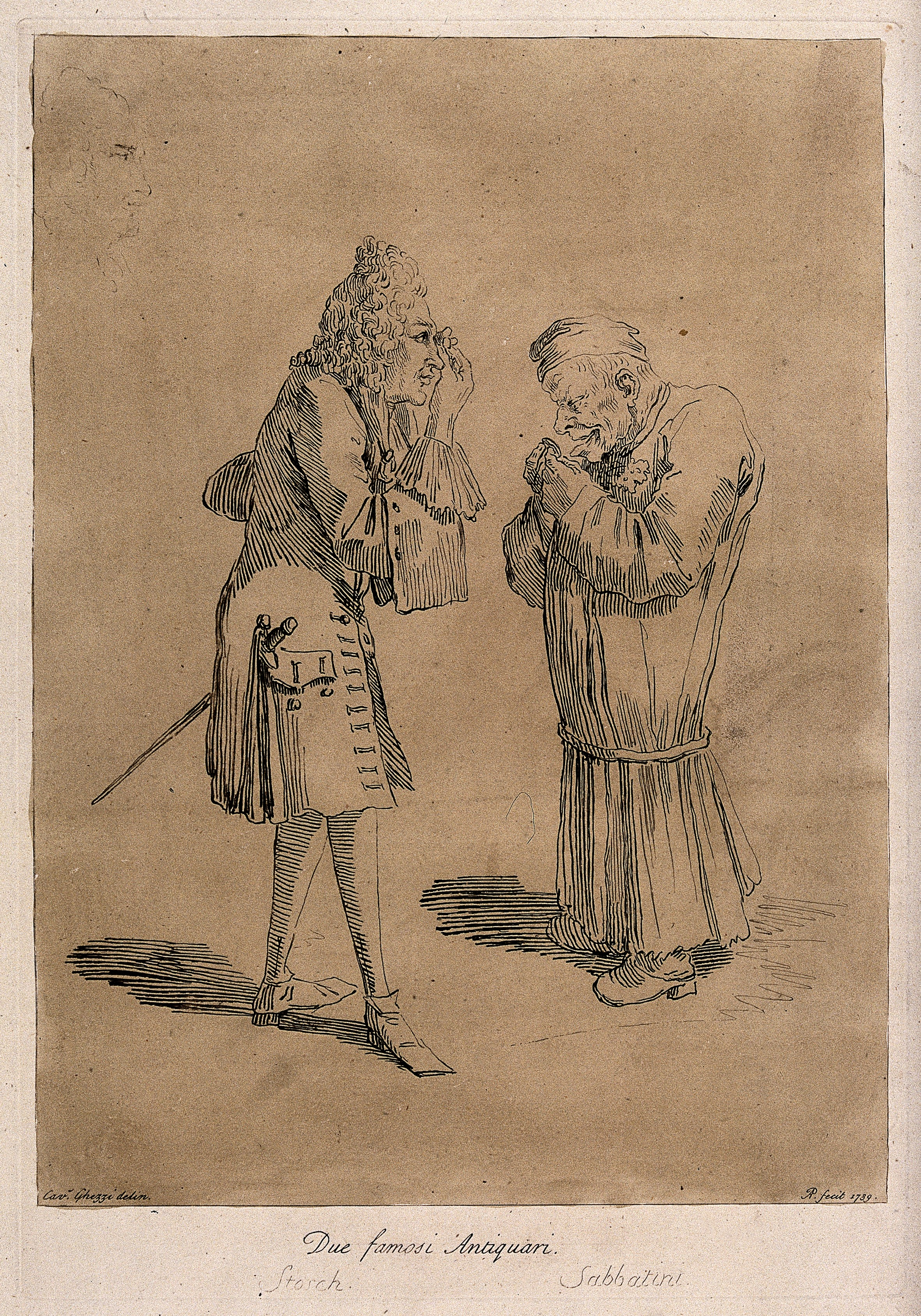
Two antiquarians

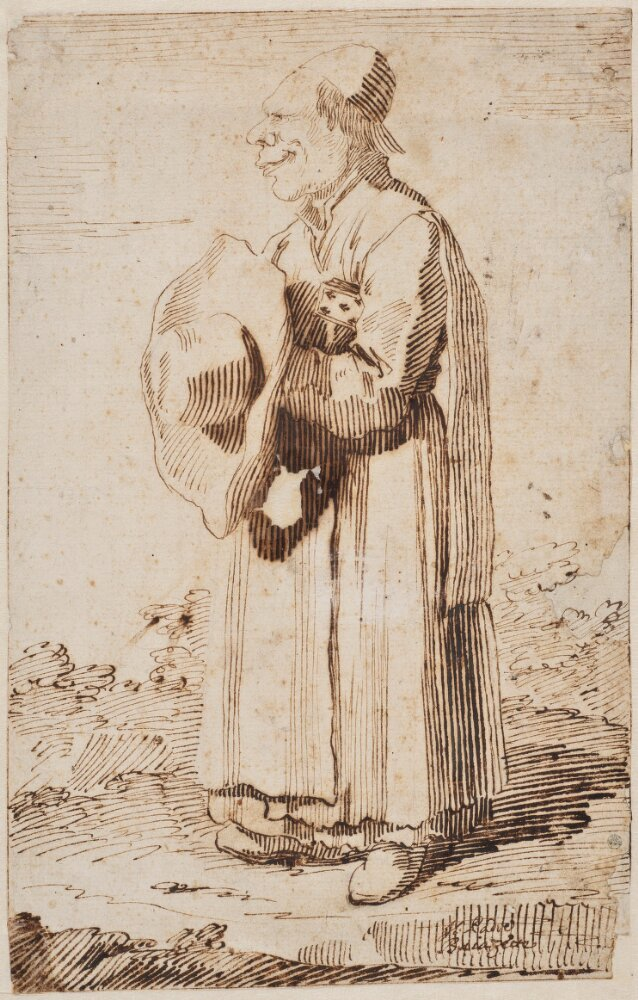
Caricature of a priest

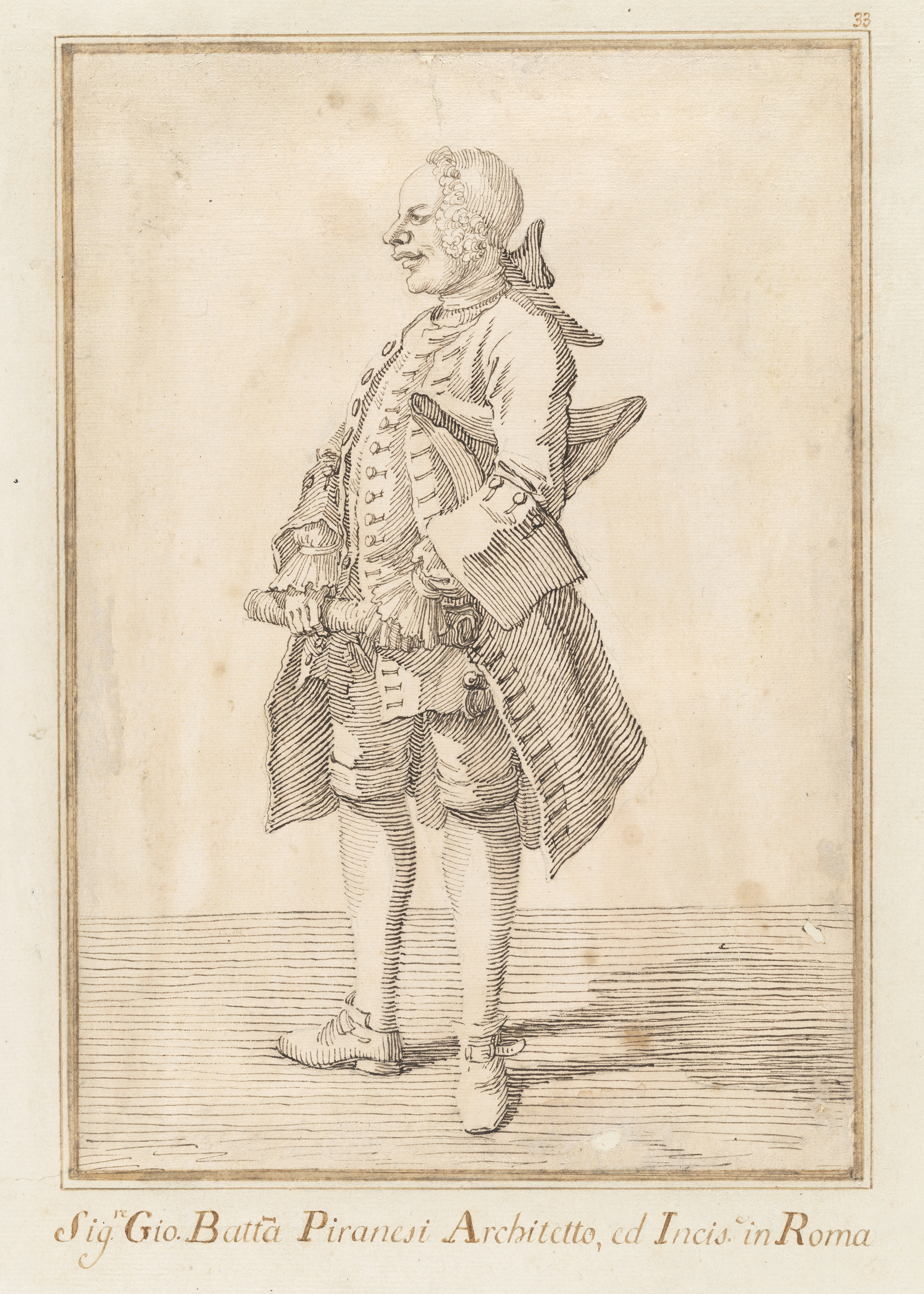
Caricature of Giovanni Battista Piranesi

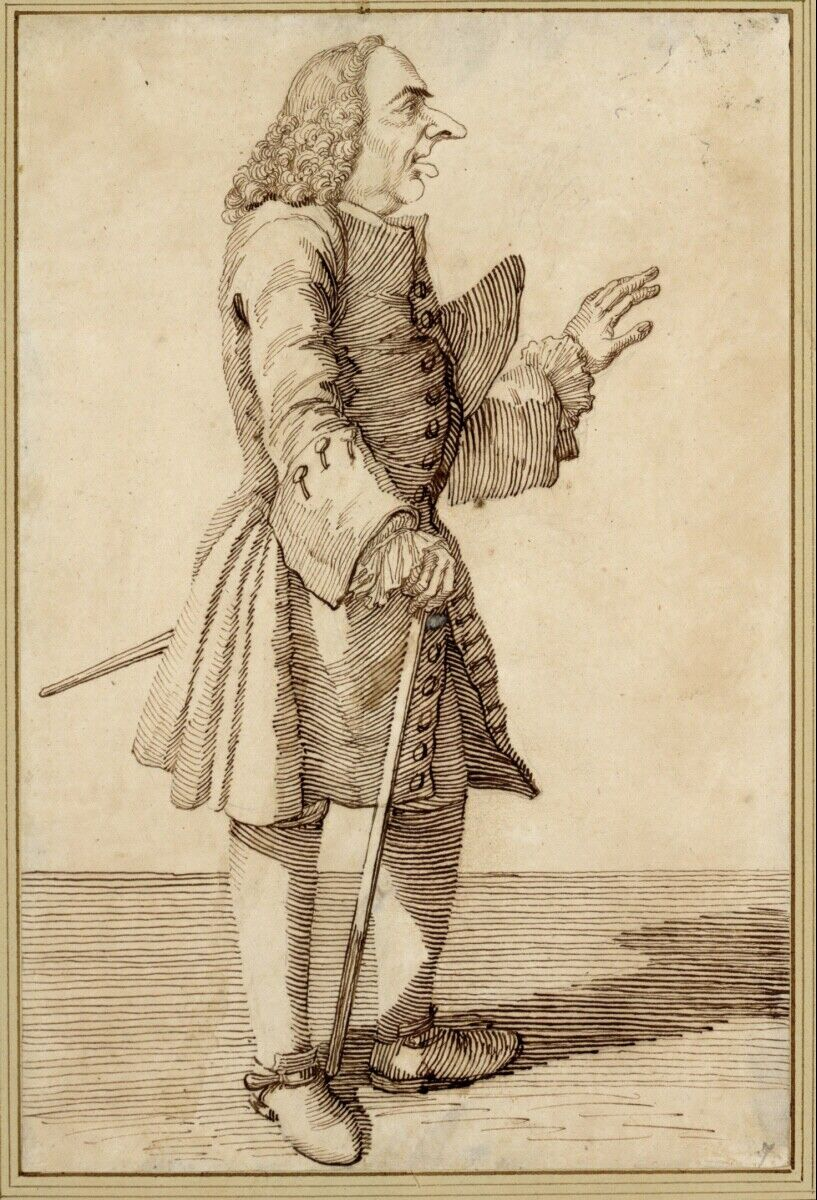
Caricature of Giovanni Vincenzo Gravina

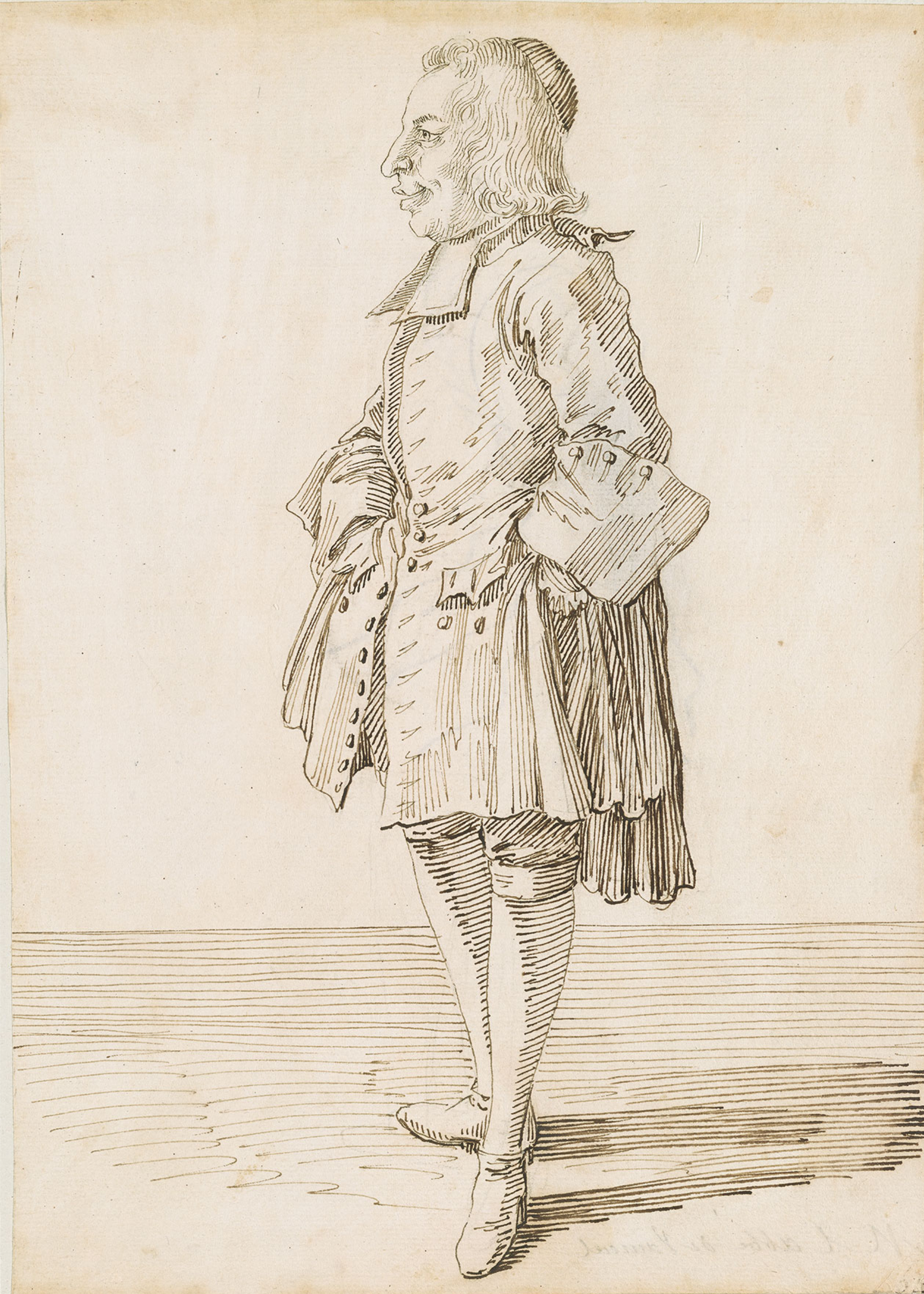
Caricature of Louis-Guy de Guérapin de Vauréal

== Sources ==
- Golzio, Vincenzo (1932). "GHEZZI, Pier Leone". Enciclopedia Italiana. Rome: Istituto dell'Enciclopedia Italiana.
- Pio, Nicola (1977). Vite. C. Enggass; R. Enggass (eds.). pp. 107–8.
- Haskell, Francis (1960). "Art Exhibitions in Seventeenth-century Rome". Studi seicenteschi. 1: 107–21.
- Susinno, Stefano (1974). "I ritratti degli academici". L'Accademia di San Luca. Rome.
- Wittkower, Rudolf (1980). Art and Architecture Italy, 1600-1750. Pelican History of Art. Penguin Books. p. 495.
- Lauterbach, Iris (1991). "Pier Leone Ghezzi und Clemens XI. Albani. Die Vorzeichnungen zu Buchillustrationen im Berliner Kupferstichkabinett". Jahrbuch der Berliner Museen. 33: 149–71. doi:10.2307/4125881. JSTOR 4125881.
- Paolo Coen; Giovan Battista Fidanza, eds. (2011). Le pietre rivelate. Lo 'Studio di molte pietre' di Pier Leone Ghezzi, manoscritto 322 della Biblioteca Universitaria Alessandrina. Rome: Istituto Poligrafico e Zecca dello Stato.
