= Antonio Amorosi =

Italian painter

- Self-portrait, Nationalmuseum, Stockholm.
- Born: 1660; Comunanza, Marche, Papal States
- Died: 5 October 1738 (aged 77–78); Rome, Papal States
- Education: Giuseppe Ghezzi
- Occupation: Painter
- Known for: Genre painting
- Movement: Baroque

Antonio Amorosi (1660 – 5 October 1738) was an Italian painter of the late-Baroque, active in Ascoli Piceno and Rome. Amorosi was famous for his lively genre scenes depicting everyday Roman popular life, heavily inspired by the tradition of the Bamboccianti.

== Biography ==
He was born in Comunanza in 1660 and moved to Rome in 1668 with the intention to become a priest, his interest in art and, in 1676, acquaintance with Giuseppe Ghezzi, made him change his mind and enter Giuseppe Ghezzi's workshop to remain there for 11 years. Around 1690 he became an independent painter. His first work, signed and dated 1690, was the Portrait of the child Filippo Ricci, now kept in the Weitzner private collection in New York.

In 1699 he frescoed the Palazzo comunale of Civitavecchia with Pope Innocent III receiving the Magistrates of the city and with the Madonna and San Fermo, destroyed in 1944; in 1702 he painted, in the church of Santa Maria della Morte in Civitavecchia, the altarpiece Saint Gregorio and the souls of Purgatory.

In the mid-seventeenth century appeared the first bambocciate, that is pictorial representations of scenes of popular life that took their roots in the pictorial culture of northern Europe genre scenes. In Italy they were marked by grotesque elements and caricatures as it was the representation of life of the "popolino" shown to the aristocratic clientele. Rather than viewing the lower classes purely through a grotesque or purely comedic lens, Amorosi often treated his humble subjects – especially children – with a sense of inherent dignity, moral seriousness, and grace.

It is said that Amorosi's interest in genre scenes was fostered by artistic preferences of circle of the Spanish ambassador in Rome, the duke of Uceda, who was himself an important commissioner of Amorosi. In this environment, among other things, Amorosi met and became friends with his future biographer and art historian Leone Pascoli. His popular scenes remained a fundamental component of his artistic activity until his death, granting him commissions from wealthy clients, most belonging to the Roman aristocracy.

In 1715, Amorosi took part in decorating the ground-floor apartment of the historic Palazzo Ruspoli in Rome. The project was carried out between 20 March and 20 November under the supervision of Domenico Paradisi, and Amorosi's contribution focused specifically on the room featuring bambocciate – lively, realistic scenes of everyday popular life.

In addition to genre scenes, he painted sacred themes, such as can be found in altarpieces in Rome. According to Pascoli, Amorosi was also a skilled copyist of Renaissance artists and a restorer. His son Filippo also collaborated in his father's workshop and was a painter of genre scenes.

== Gallery ==
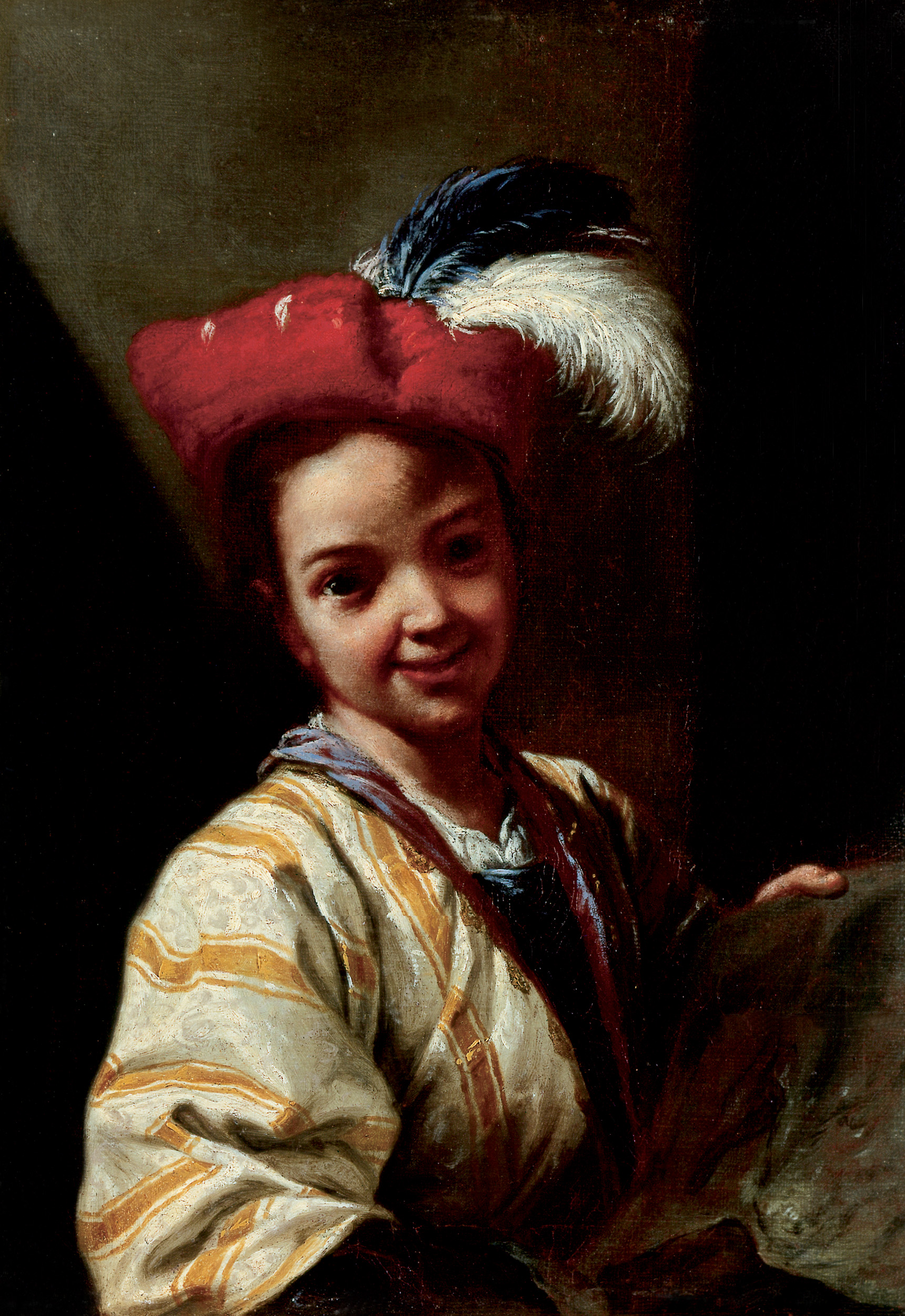
Boy with Drawing, oil on canvas, 45 x 32.5 cm. In the collection of the Landesmuseum Joanneum

Nude asleep in an interior, c. 1700, private collection

Boy Holding a Caricature, c. 1700, private collection

Girl with a Piece of Jewellery, c. 1700, Nationalmuseum, Stockholm

Roman Vagabond, 1710, National Gallery Prague

Sewing Woman, c. 1700, National Museum in Kraków

Peasant Family, c. 1700, Hatton Gallery, Newcastle upon Tyne

Tavern Courtyard Scene, c. 1700, private collection
