= Louis-Guy de Guérapin de Vauréal =

French aristocrat, ecclesiastic and diplomat

- Bishop of Rennes
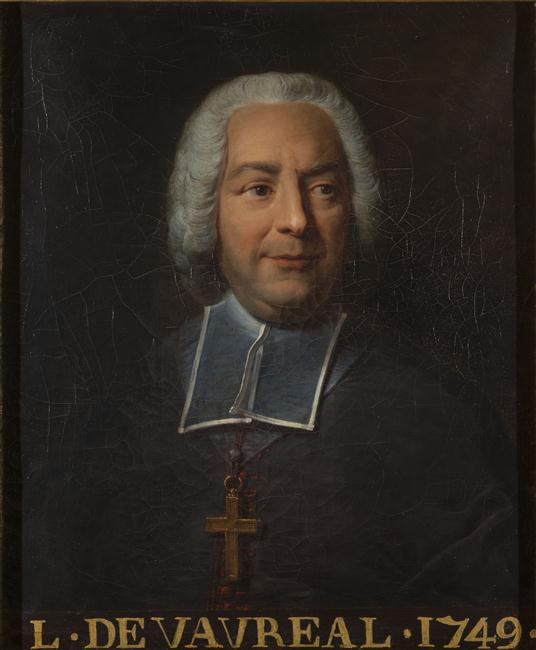
- Louis-Guy de Guérapin, Baron de Vauréal et Comte de Belleval, Évêque de Rennes. The date of 1749, which appears in his portrait, corresponds to that of his election at the Académie Française (seat 23)
- Church: Catholic Church
- Diocese: Diocese of Rennes
- In office: 21 July 1732 – 3 March 1759
- Predecessor: Charles-Louis-Auguste Le Tonnelier de Breteuil
- Successor: Jean-Antoine de Touchebœuf-Beaumont des Junies

Orders
- Ordination: 1714
- Consecration: 24 August 1732 by Henri-Pons de Thiard de Bissy

Personal details
- Born: 3 January 1688 Beton-Bazoches, Champagne, Kingdom of France
- Died: 17 June 1760 (aged 72) Magny-Cours, Nivernais, Kingdom of France

Louis-Guy de Guérapin de Vauréal, also Louis-Gui de Guérapin de Vauréal or Louis Guy Guerrapin de Vauréal, Baron de Vauréal et Comte de Belleval, (3 January 1688 – 17 June 1760), was a French aristocrat, ecclesiastic and diplomat.

== Aristocrat, Évêque, Ambassador and Academic ==
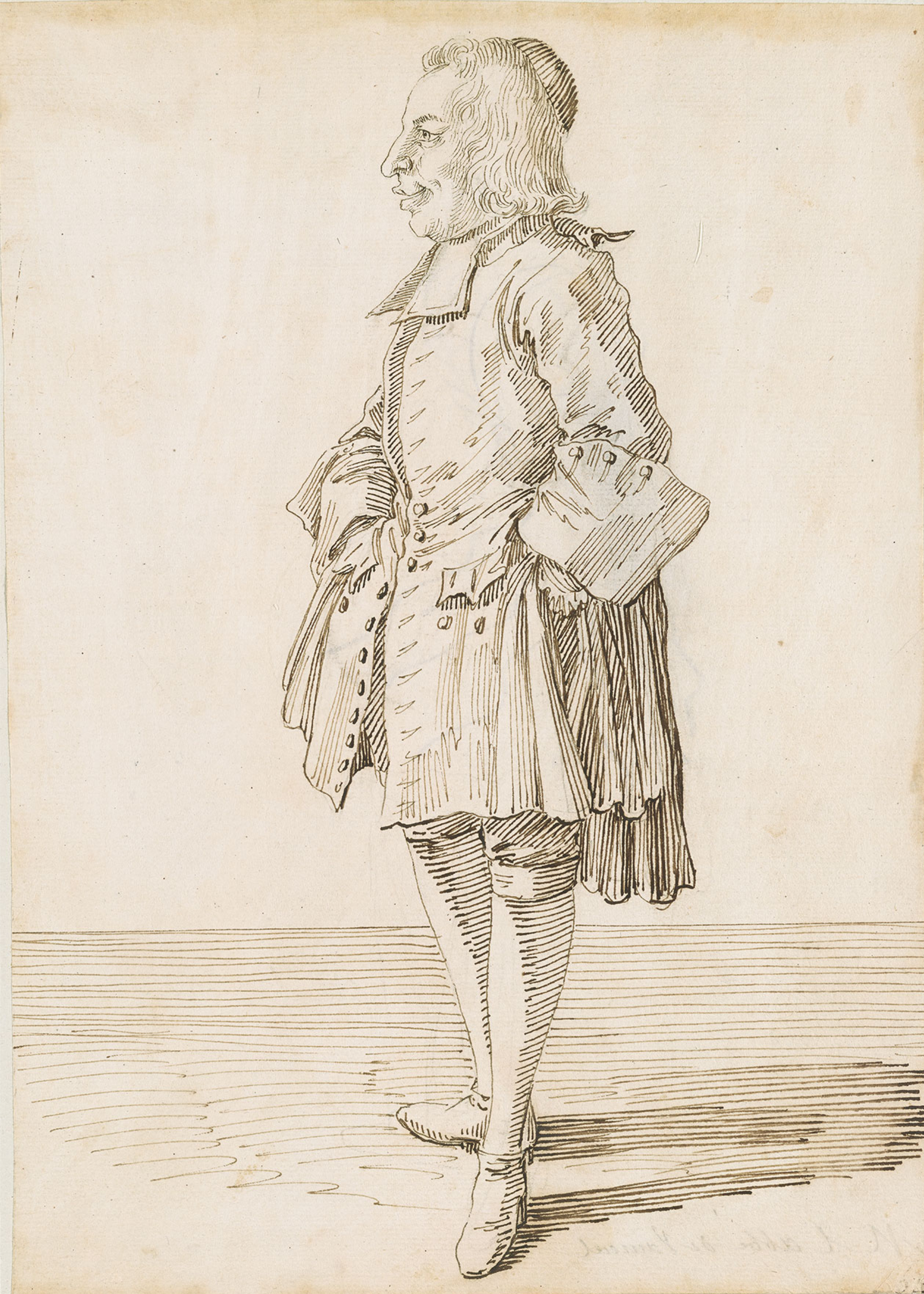
Caricature of Louis-Guy de Guérapin de Vauréal by Pier Leone Ghezzi.

Louis-Guy de Guérapin de Vauréal was the son of Michel-Antoine Guérapin, Comte de Belleval, and Françoise Fretel de Bazoche. He was ordained a priest in 1714. From 1732 until 1759 he was Évêque de Rennes.

The évêque was a prominent figure at the royal court during the reign of King Louis XV. Amongst others, he held the position of Maître ecclésiastique de la Chapelle du Roi (Ecclesiastical Master of the King’s Chapel) from 1732 until his death in 1760.

Louis-Guy de Guérapin de Vauréal was abbé commendataire of the Abbaye Notre-Dame de Molesme (from 1723), the Abbaye Saint-Aubin d'Angers (from 1742) and the Abbaye Notre-Dame de Jouy. He was popular among people because of his charity. He was a major opponent of the Jansenists and presided at five assemblies of the clergy of Brittany in the years 1732, 1734, 1736, 1738 and 1740.

=== In His Majesty's Diplomatic Service ===
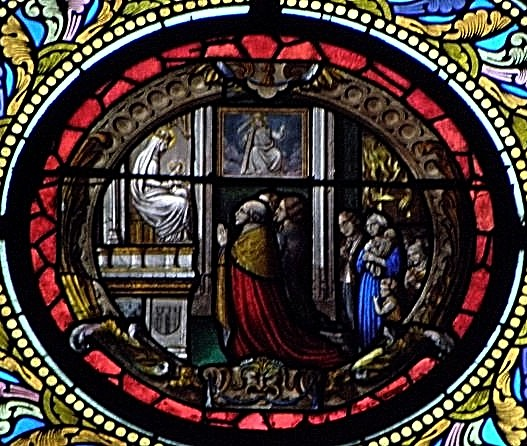
Stained glass window of the Basilique Notre-Dame-de-Bonne-Nouvelle in Rennes. It shows Louis-Guy de Guérapin de Vauréal in prayer, imploring the Virgin during the great fire of 1732.

Louis-Guy de Guérapin de Vauréal also served in the diplomatic service. Between 1741 and 1749, the évêque was the French ambassador in Madrid (appointed on 8 March 1741 by King Louis XV), where, in 1745, King Philip V made him a grandee. On 4 September 1749, he was elected to the Académie française (seat 23).

In 1750, he bought the Hôtel Chanac de Pompadour and made it his residence in Paris. He kept the hôtel particulier until his death in 1760.

=== Death and legacy ===
Louis-Guy de Guérapin de Vauréal died, returning from Vichy, in the village of Magny-Cours on 17 June 1760. The only writings he has left are some church documents and diplomatic dispatches. However, as Abbé François Marie Tresvaux du Fraval (1782–1862) remarked: "Louis-Guy de Guérapin de Vauréal had the talent to write well, and since he was an ambassador, his dispatches were considered models in their field."
