= Sebastiano Ghezzi =

Italian painter and architect (1580–1645)

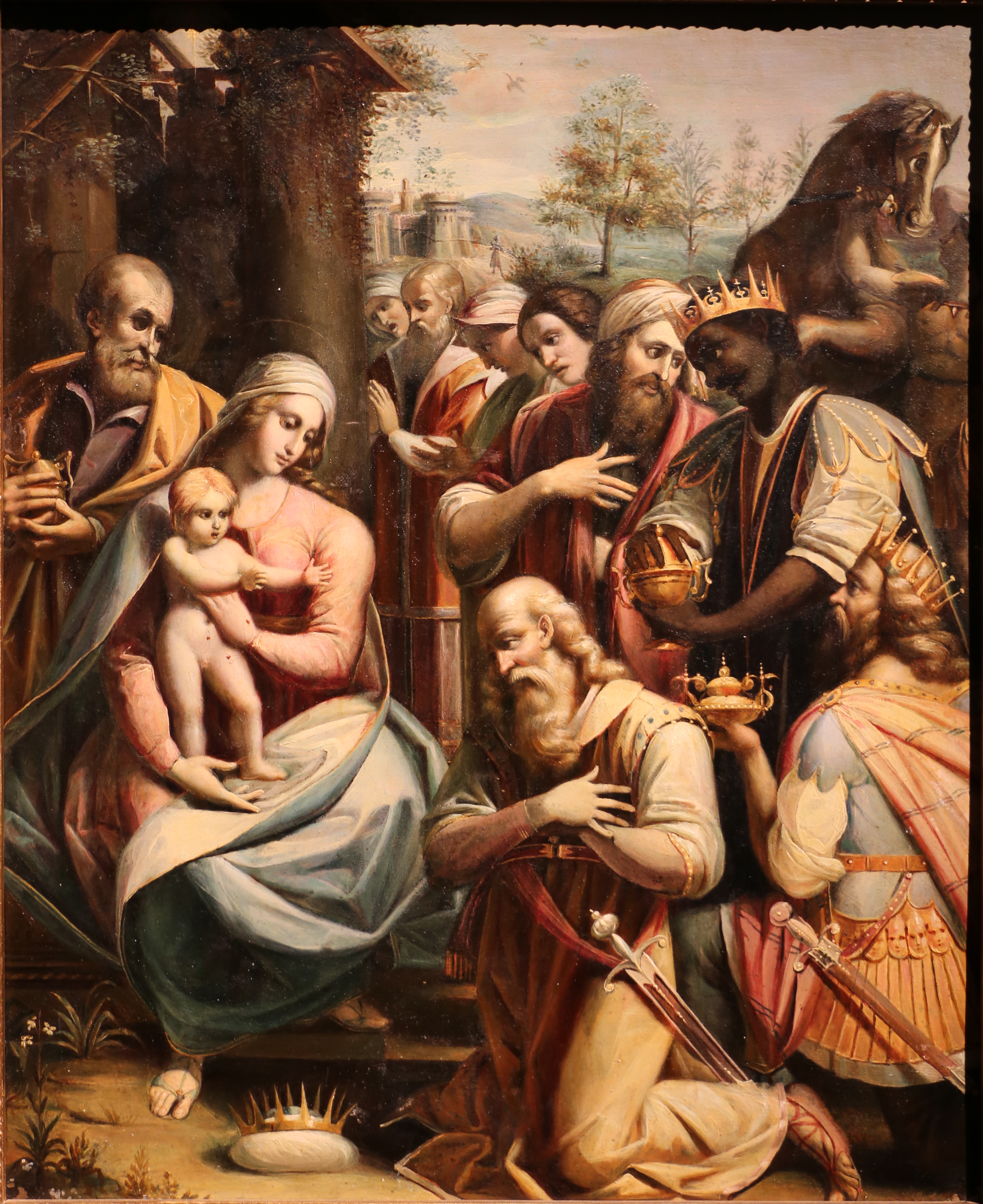
Adoration of the Three Kings, Montalto delle Marche

Sebastiano Ghezzi (1580–1645) was an Italian painter and architect of the Baroque period.

== Biography ==
Born in Comunanza near Ascoli Piceno, he travelled to Bologna, where he received instruction in design from Guercino. He, however, became more popular as an architect. He was named Papal engineer by Pope Urban VIII, and awarded a knighthood of the Cross. His son Giuseppe was known as a painter; his grandson, Pier Leone, has become known for his ink caricatures. Sebastiano frescoed the lunettes (1612–1613) in the cloister of S. Domenico in Ascoli, where he left a self-portrait. The frescoes are now significantly decayed. He also painted the main altar for the church of San Francesco in Comunanza.
