= Filippo Martinucci =

Italian architect

Filippo Martinucci (died 1862) was an Italian architect. He was the son of Vincenzo Martinucci. His son, also Vincenzo, was also an architect who collaborated with his father on several projects.

Among his works in Rome were the Palace of S. Felice in the Via Dataria, the renovation of the Chapel of S. Sebastiano in Sant'Andrea della Valle finished by his son according to plans by Filippo Martinucci (1869), The Inner Staicase of the Vatican (1860), and the Chapel of S. Paul of the Cross in the Basilica of Saints John and Paul (1857), finished by his son, Vincenzo.
