= San Sebastiano de Via Papae =

Church building in Rome, Italy

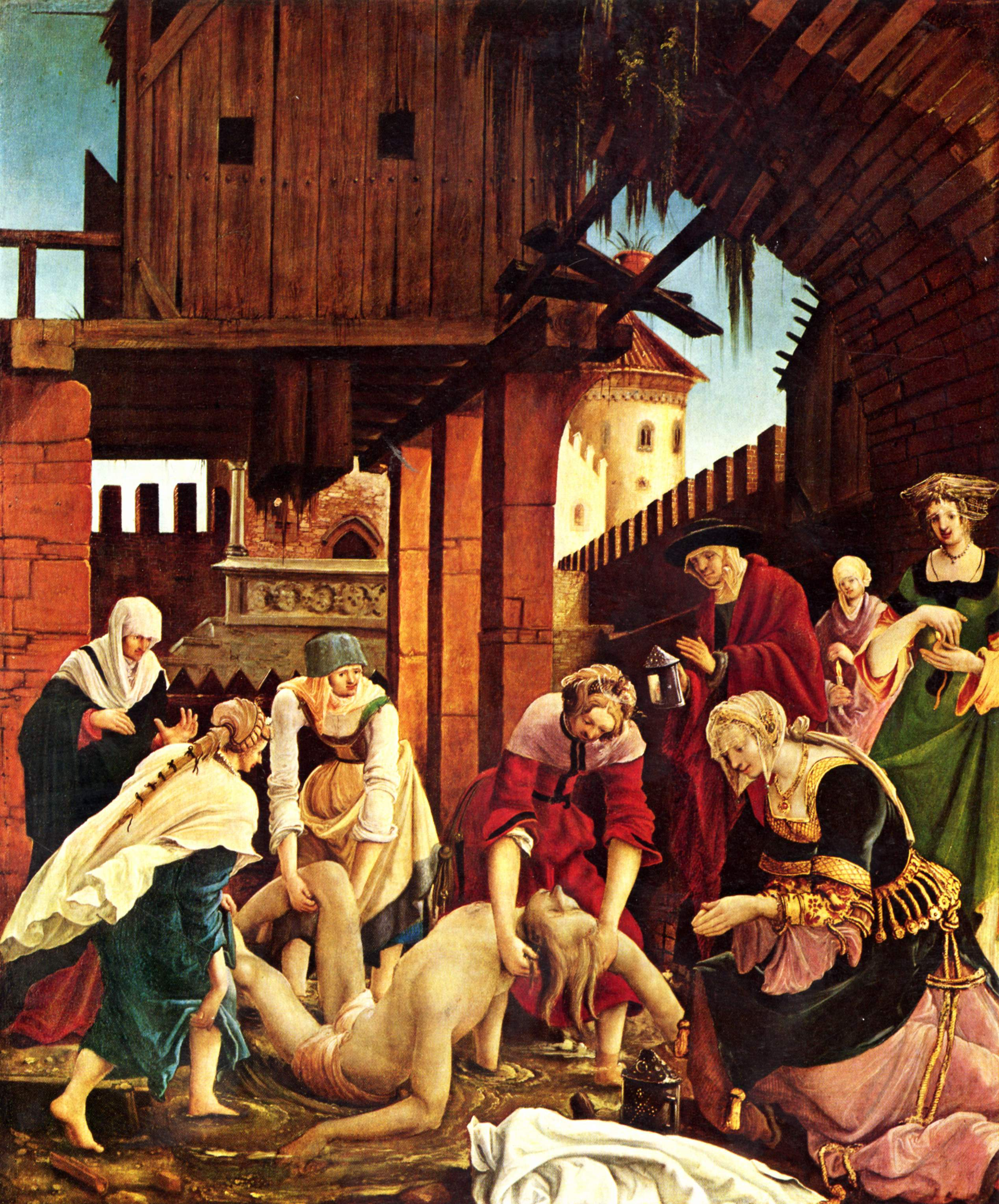
Salvaging the Body of Saint Sebastian (Altdorfer, 1509–1516). There is a tradition that the church of San Sebastian de Via Papae stood on the spot where the martyr's body was recovered.

San Sebastiano de Via Papae was a small church in the Sant'Eustachio rione of Rome that was demolished in the 1590s in order to enable the construction of the church of Sant'Andrea della Valle.

== Name and dedication ==
The church's dedication to Saint Sebastian comes from a tradition that it was built on the spot where the Christian noblewoman Lucina rescued the saint's corpse from the sewer where it had been thrown after his martyrdom. In regard to that tradition's historical reliability, the archaeologist Mariano Armellini is skeptical, but nevertheless deems it certain that the antiquity of the church means that it references some definite memory of the martyr.

The designation of via Papae (Latin: way of the Pope), by which the church was commonly referred, recalls its location along a ceremonial papal route that began at the present site of Sant'Andrea della Valle and the piazza which stands in front of it, which before the sixteenth century was called Piazza di Siena. For that reason, the church is called San Sebastiano in piazza di Siena in a catalog dating from the pontificate of Pope Pius V (1566–1572).

The church is not to be confused with the similarly-named San Sebastiano in Via Pontificum, which was in the Borgo and had fallen into ruin by the pontificate of Pius V.

== History ==
The first surviving references to the small church of San Sebastiano date from the twelfth century, where it is listed in various registers of churches in the city of Rome. Although it was counted as a parish church, it remained subsidiary to larger churches in the neighborhood; it seems that it was originally among the dependent churches of San Lorenzo in Damaso, as is referenced in an 1186 bull of Pope Urban III. In the thirteenth century, however, there arose a dispute over the church between the priests of San Lorenzo in Damaso and those of Sant'Eustachio, the resolution of which is noted in a bull of Pope Gregory IX dated April 9, 1231. The apparent outcome was that its administration was transferred to the priests of Sant'Eustachio.

The Codex Taurinensis of 1320 places the church in the third class, and records that ecclesia s. Sebastiani de via Papae habet unum sacerdotem ("the church of Saint Sebastian de via Papae has one priest").

In the late fifteenth century, the church gained notoriety for an episode recorded in the diaries of Stefano Infessura (c. 1435 – c. 1500), which recounts how supporters of the Colonna and Della Valle families came to blows on the church's porch:

Dell'anno Domini 1482 a dì 4 d'aprile lo papa fece gittare in terra le case di misser Iorio Santa Croce et del fratello; et questo fece perchè la notte innanti lo ditto missor Iorio, con molti compagni armati et bene in ponto, assaltaro casa di missore Liello et di Iacovo della Valle; et poseronsi nello porticale di Santo Sebastiano, et lì combattendo contra ad quelli della Valle, uccisero lo signore Ieronimo Colonna, figlio naturale tantum dello prefetto della Colonna ...

In the year of the Lord 1482 on the fourth day of April, the Pope razed to the ground the homes of Iorio Santa Croce and his brother; and this he did because the night before, the same Iorio, with many companions (armed, and very much so), assaulted the home of Liello and Giacomo della Valle; and positioning themselves in the portico of San Sebastiano, and fighting there against those who belonged to della Valle, they killed Geronimo Colonna, the full natural son of the prefect of the Colonnas.

The church was demolished under Pope Sixtus V (term 1585-1590) together with the adjoining parish house in order to enable the construction of the much larger and grander church of Sant'Andrea della Valle. A papal brief of August 18, 1590, however, stipulates that because Sant'Andrea would "embrace and enclose" the site of the former church of Saint Sebastian, there ought to be an altar dedicated to that saint inside the new one. As a result, there is a side chapel in Sant'Andrea della Valle in honor of Sebastian and a statue of him on its facade, both of which serve to perpetuate the memory of the demolished church.

Another remnant of the vanished church is discernible in the Barberini Chapel of Sant'Andrea. In that chapel, which is the first on the left as one enters the church, there is a small chamber, which is separated by an ironwork grill from the rest of the chapel. This spot marks the location where Sebastian's body was reputedly recovered, and where the high altar of the former church once stood. Furthermore, the feast day of Saint Sebastian has historically been celebrated with special festivity in Sant'Andrea.
