= Sant'Andrea della Valle =

Roman Catholic basilica, a landmark of Rome, Italy

Church of St. Andrew of the Valley
- Sant'Andrea della Valle (Italian); S. Andreæ Apostoli de Valle (Latin)
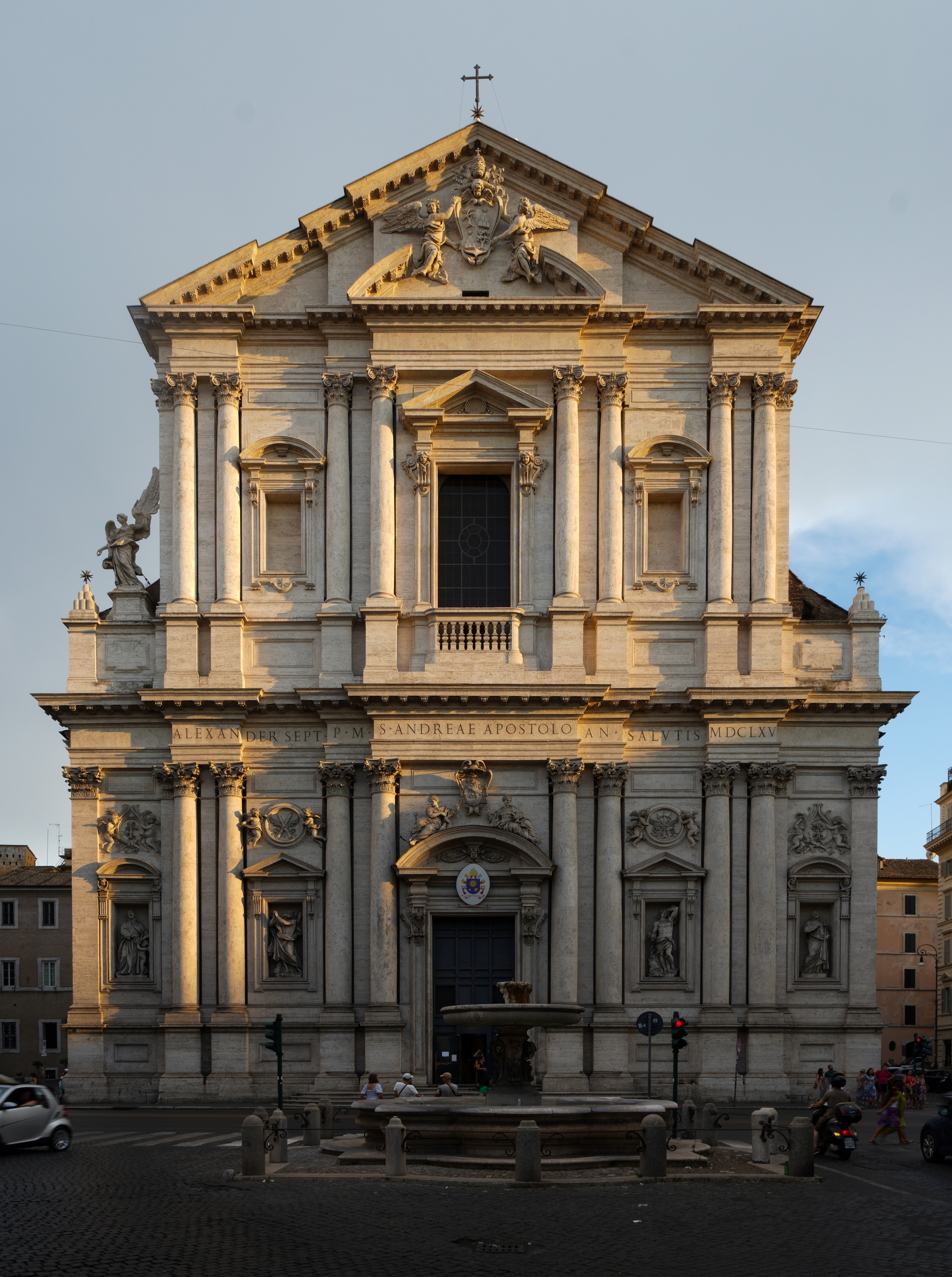
- The Baroque façade of Sant'Andrea della Valle
- Click on the map for a fullscreen view
- 41°53′45″N 12°28′28″E
- Location: Rome
- Country: Italy
- Denomination: Catholic
- Religious institute: Theatines

History
- Status: Titular church, Minor basilica
- Consecrated: 1650

Architecture
- Architectural type: Church
- Style: Renaissance
- Groundbreaking: 1590
- Completed: 1650; 376 years ago

Administration
- Province: Diocese of Rome

Sant'Andrea della Valle is a titular church and minor basilica in the rione of Sant'Eustachio of the city of Rome, Italy. The basilica is the seat of the general curia of the Theatines and is located on the Piazza Vidoni, at the intersection of Corso Vittorio Emanuele (facing facade) and Corso Rinascimento. It is one of the great 17th century preaching churches built by Counter-Reformation orders in the Centro Storico (the others being San Carlo ai Catinari of the Barnabites, The Gesù and Sant'Ignazio of the Jesuits, and the Chiesa Nuova of the Oratorians).

== Overview ==
A church was initially planned when, in 1582, Donna Costanza Piccolomini d'Aragona, duchess of Amalfi and descendant of the family of Pope Pius II, bequeathed her palace and the adjacent church of San Sebastiano in central Rome to the Theatine order for construction of a new church. Since Amalfi's patron was Saint Andrew, the church was planned in his honor. Work initially started around 1590 under the designs of Giacomo della Porta and Pier Paolo Olivieri, and under the patronage of Cardinal Gesualdo. With the previous patron's death, direction of the church passed to Cardinal Alessandro Peretti di Montalto, nephew of Pope Sixtus V. Work restarted by 1608, financed by what was then an enormous endowment of over 150,000 gold scudi, and with a more grandiose plan designed mainly by Carlo Maderno. The interior of the church was completed by 1650, with some changes added by Francesco Grimaldi.

=== Dome ===
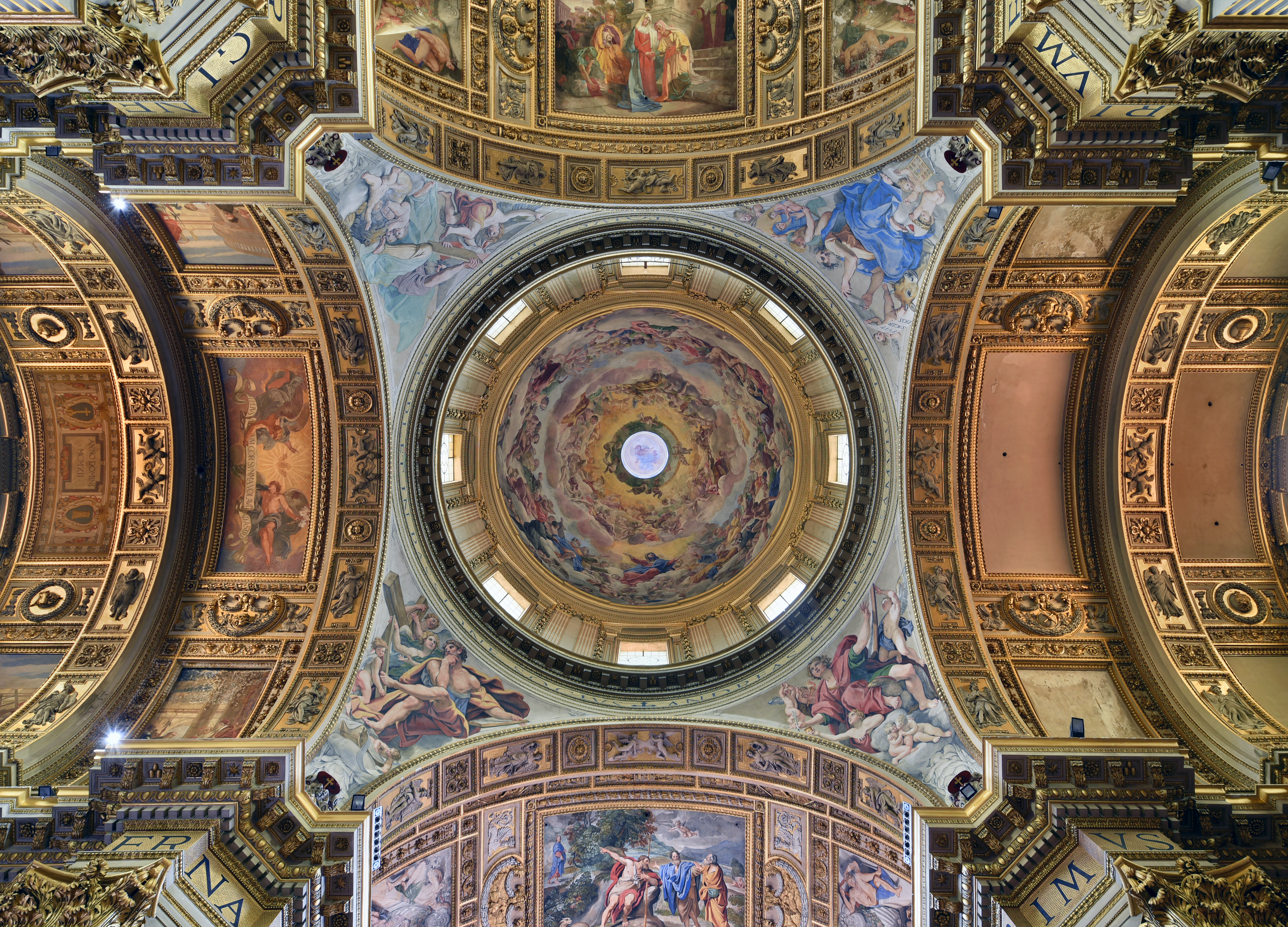
Windows on the ceiling, allowing natural light to illuminate the interior

The fresco decoration of Sant'Andrea's dome was one of the largest commissions of its day. The work was disputed by two Carracci pupils, Giovanni Lanfranco and Domenichino. In 1608, Lanfranco had been chosen by Cardinal Alessandro, but the Ludovisi papacy of Pope Gregory XV favored the Bolognese Domenichino. In the end, both artists were employed, and Lanfranco's lavish dome decoration (completed 1627) set the model for such decorations for the following decades. This dome was for a long time the third largest dome in Rome, after the Basilica of St Peter and the Pantheon.

=== Chapels on the right side ===
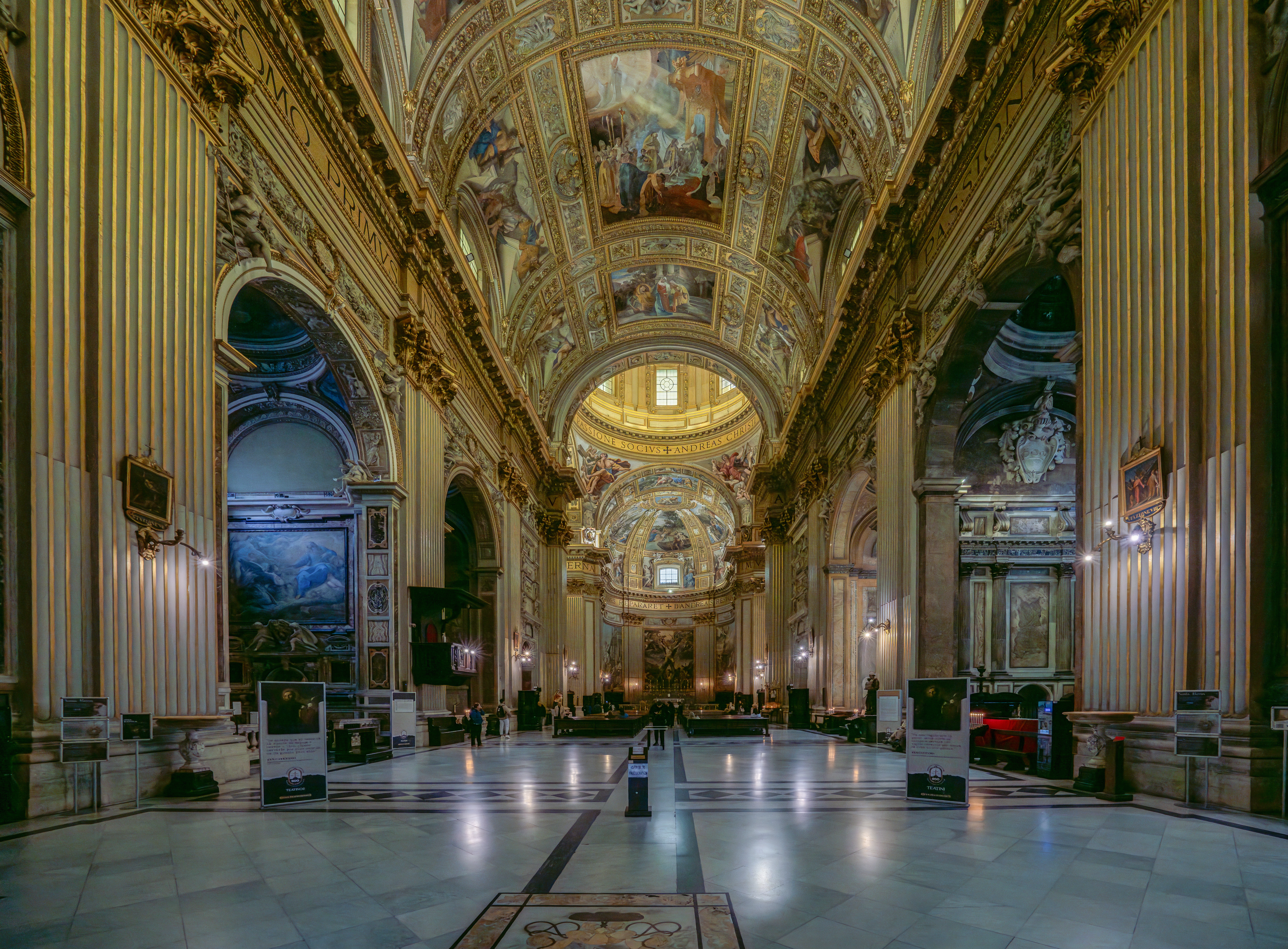
Interior of the church

The Ginetti Chapel, first on the right, was designed by Carlo Fontana in 1670, while the sculptural relief in white marble depicting Angel Urges Sacred Family to Flee to Egypt (1675) was sculpted Antonio Raggi. The angel is depicted in the style of his mentor, Bernini. In this chapel are buried Cardinal Marzio Ginetti (died 1671) and his nephew, the Cardinal Giovanni Francesco Ginetti (died 1691).

The second Strozzi Chapel has a Pietà, Leah and Rachel (1616), copies in bronze by Gregorio De Rossi from originals by Michelangelo. The chapel was probably designed by Michelangelo, but executed by Leone Strozzi (1555–1632). Beneath the statues of Leah and Rachel are two bronze bas-reliefs depicting a "Deposition from the Cross" and "Christ's Descent into Limbo". The cenotaphs in black marble in the side walls were erected for the Strozzi family: Cardinal Lorenzo (died 1571), Leone (died 1554), Pietro (died 1558), Roberto Strozzi (died 1566) and Maddalena Medici.

The chapel of "Our Lady of the Sacred Heart" (1887–1889) was designed by Aristide Leonori. The painting of the Madonna is by Silverio Capparoni and was blessed by Pope Pius IX.

In the right transept is the Chapel of St Andrew Avellino with Glory of Sant'Andrea Avellino (1625) by Giovanni Lanfranco, who also frescoed the impressive Glory of Paradise (1625–28) in the cupola, with figures of the evangelists in the pendentives (1621–1628) by his rival, Domenichino.

In the corner of the right transept are situated two chapels. The chapel of the Crucifix (1647) displays an antique wooden crucifix above a painting of the Madonna inside a radiant halo. On the right side is the tomb of the Theatine Cardinal St Giuseppe Maria Tomasi. The "Oratory of the Divine Love" dates from 1751.

=== Chapels on the left side ===
The Chapel of the Madonna della Purità was originally dedicated to the Holy Family. In 1647 it was designated to the Madonna, patroness of the Theatines. The altar was consecrated in 1725 and shows beneath the tomb of the martyr Saint Fortunatus. The four lunettes on the arches were painted by Silvio Galimberti in 1912. The altarpiece Madonna della Purità (1647) is a copy by the Neapolitan painter Alessandro Francesi of an original (1641) by the Spanish painter Luis de Morales, still located in the Neapolitan church of San Paolo Maggiore). It was adorned with a golden radiant halo in gratitude for having saved the city from famine. On the left wall of the chapel is the tomb of Cardinal Stoppani (died 1774).

The left transept is dedicated to Saint Cajetan, founder of the Theatines. The altarpiece, depicting St Cajetan adoring the Madonna and Child (1770) was painted by Mattia de Mare, while the altar dates from 1912 by Cesare Bazzani. The frescoes (1770) on the side walls were painted by Alessio D'Elia. In front of the altar are allegorical statues of Abundance and Wisdom by Giulio Tadolini.

Over the entrance to the left circular chapel is the tomb of Pope Pius II (1475), completed by a follower of Andrea Bregno in 1615.

The third chapel on the left is dedicated to Saint Sebastian and was decorated with paintings by Filippo Martinucci in 1869. The altarpiece "Saint Sebastian" was painted by Giovanni de' Vecchi in 1614.

The chapel "Rucellai o Dei Beati" was designed in 1610 by Matteo Castelli de Melide, a relative of the Borromini family. The altarpiece, attributed to the Sicilian painter Francesco Manno (1754–1831), depict three Blessed Theatines : Marinoni, Burali D'Arezzo and Tomasi. On the right wall is a painting by Cristoforo Roncalli (Pomarancio) of the archangel Gabriel in the presence of the Eternal Father. Pomarancio also painted The Archangel Raphael and Tobias the elder on the left wall and the fresco in the cupola Glory of music making angels. The other paintings are by Ambrogio Buonvicino and depict Angels in Glory. In the left wall is the sepulchral monument in black marble of Orazio Rucellai (1604–1673) and the tomb of Giovanni della Casa, author of Il Galateo. The right wall houses the tomb of Annibale Rucellai (died in 1601), bishop of Carcassonne, France.

The last chapel on the left is the Cappella Barberini, designed by Matteo Castelli di Melide in 1616, on a commission from Cardinal Maffeo Barberini (who became Pope Urban VIII). The altarpiece Assumption (between four Corinthian columns in antique rose marble) and the paintings Visitation and Lucia collects the body of St Sebastian are by Domenico Cresti (il Passignano). On the left, in the furthest niche is a Saint John the Baptist (1616) by Pietro Bernini, and in the closest niche on the right is Francesco Mochi's Saint Martha (1629), which is significantly larger than the other three sculptures, with Saint Martha seeming to want to leave her niche.

=== Apse ===
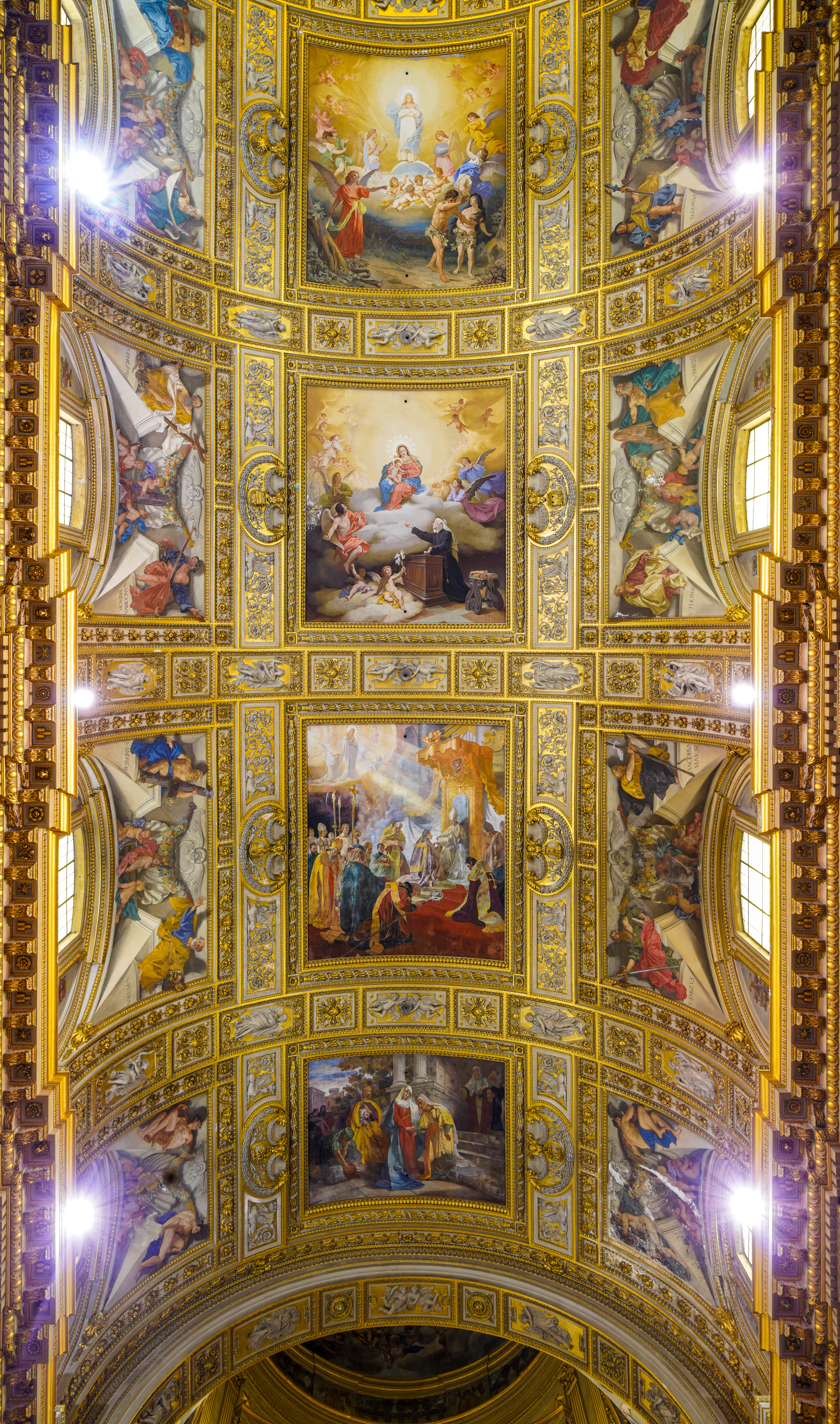
Vault over the nave

The apse decoration is by Alessandro Algardi. In the apse half-dome the History of Sant'Andrea and Virtues are frescoed by Domenichino. In the apse walls are three frescoes Crucifixion, Martyrdom and burial of Sant'Andrea by Mattia Preti (1650–1651), as commissioned by Donna Olimpia Maidalchini, sister-in-law of Pope Innocent X.

=== Facade ===
The Baroque facade was added between 1655 and 1663 by Carlo Rainaldi, at the expense of Cardinal Francesco Peretti di Montalto, nephew of Alessandro.

== Pipe organ ==
Sant'Andrea della Valle is home to a two manual, 36 stop pipe organ. Originally built in 1845, it is currently maintained by Stefano Buccolini of Organi Buccolini in Rome. The basilica's current organist has been playing at St. Andrea della Valle since January 2017 and can often be heard practicing on weekday afternoons.

== Varia ==
The church houses the cenotaphs of Popes Pius II and Pius III, who are buried in the church.

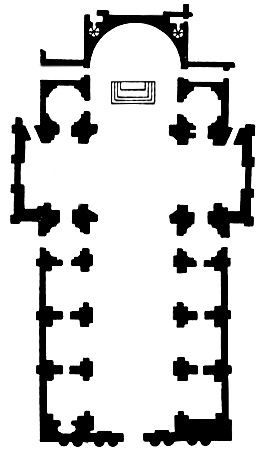
Plan of the basilica.

The first act of the opera Tosca by Puccini is set in Sant'Andrea della Valle. However, the Cappella Attavanti used was a poetic invention.

Sant'Andrea della Valle later became a model for the construction of other churches like the St. Kajetan church in Munich and the Church of St. Anne, Kraków.

On the square in front of the church stands the fountain of Carlo Maderno, which until 1937 was situated in the now destroyed Piazza Scossacavalli in the Borgo.

== Cardinal–Priests ==
The Church of S. Andrea della Valle was designated a cardinatial titulus on 12 March 1960. This was in preparation for Pope John XXIII's creation of seven new cardinals on 28 March. The number of cardinals had exceeded the traditional number of seventy, and new titles were needed. The following have been Cardinal Priests of the Titulus S. Andreae Apostoli de Valle:

- Luigi Cardinal Traglia (28 Mar 1960 Appointed – 28 Apr 1969 Appointed, Cardinal-Priest of San Lorenzo in Damaso)
- Joseph Cardinal Höffner (24 Feb 1969 Appointed – 16 Oct 1987 Died)
- Giovanni Cardinal Canestri (28 Jun 1988 Appointed – 29 Apr 2015 Died)
- Dieudonné Nzapalainga (19 Nov 2016 Appointed – Present)

== See also ==
- 17th-century Western domes

== Sources ==
- Alba Costamagna, Daniele Ferrara, and Cecilia Grilli, Sant'Andrea della Valle (Milan: Skira, 2003).
- Haskell, Francis (1993). "Chapter 8". Patrons and Painters: Art and Society in Baroque Italy. 1980. Yale University Press. pp. 205–08.
- Howard Hibbard, Carlo Maderno and Roman Architecture, 1580–1630 (State College PA, USA: Pennsylvania State University Press, 1971).
- Cecilia Pericoli Ridolfini, Roma. Sant'Andrea della Valle (Bologna: Officine grafiche Poligrafici il Resto del Carlino, 1967).
- Howard Hibbard, "The Early History of Sant'Andrea della Valle", The Art Bulletin 43 (1961), 289–318.
- Sergio Ortolani, San Andrea della Valle (Roma: Casa Editrice Roma, 1923).
- A. Boni, S. Andrea della Valle, nella sua storia e nei suoi monumenti (Rome 1907)
- Ottaviano Caroselli, Alcuni studiosi del Domenichino nella Chiesa di S. Andrea della Valle in Roma (Tolentino: F. Filelfo 1905).

Preceded by Sant'Andrea delle Fratte	Landmarks of Rome; Sant'Andrea della Valle	Succeeded by Sant'Antonio da Padova in Via Merulana
