= San Filippo, Matelica =

Church building in Matelica, Italy

Coordinates: 43°15′23″N 13°00′36″E

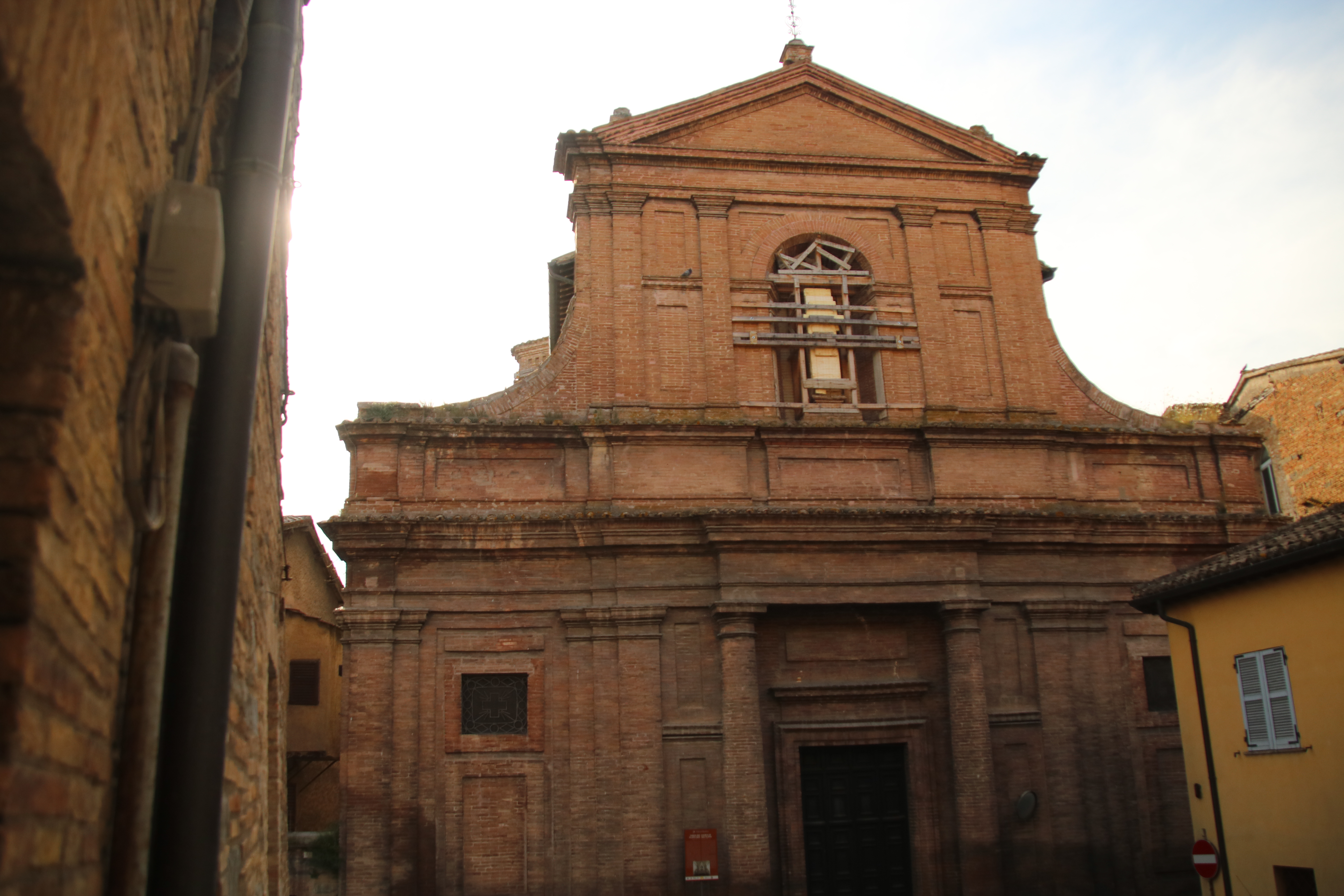

San Filippo is a Baroque-style, Roman Catholic church and monastery located on Via Guglielmo Oberdan in the city of Matelica, province of Macerata, region of Marche, Italy.

== History ==
The present church was built between 1655 and 1660 for the Oratorians under the patronage of the aristocrat Ottaviano Grassetti. The church was consecrated in 1737, along with a refurbishment of the adjacent convent and oratory.

The brick façade has a central façade with a terracotta statue of Saint Philip Neri. Upon the establishment of the Kingdom of Italy, the convent became a school of artisans, and later the Regia Scuola Tecnica Industriale, no longer active.

The nave is oval in layout with four lateral chapels. Among the works in the interiors, the second chapel has an altarpiece depicting the Madonna of the Scapular by Giacinto Brandi, another 18th-century altarpiece with a Presentation at the Temple by an unknown artists. The first chapel on the left has a Miracle of San Filippo occurring to Cardinal Orsini (1725) by Pier Leone Ghezzi, and a Visit of San Filippo to Pope St Pius V. The organ in the façade is highly decorated.
