= Giuseppe Ghezzi =

Italian painter (1634-1721)

- Pygmalion, Budapest, Museum of Fine Arts
- Born: 6 November 1634; Comunanza, Papal States
- Died: 10 November 1721 (aged 87); Rome, Papal States
- Education: Guercino
- Occupations: Engraver; Architect
- Known for: Painting
- Movement: Baroque
- Father: Sebastiano Ghezzi

Giuseppe Ghezzi (6 November 1634 – 10 November 1721) was an Italian painter of the Baroque period, active mainly in Rome.

== Biography ==
Born in Comunanza, in the Marche (then part of the Papal States), he was the son of the painter Sebastiano Ghezzi, a painter and architect for the papacy of Pope Urban VIII. Sebastiano died when Giuseppe was only 11 years old, and he was sent to Fermo to study philosophy and letters, but also took painting instruction under Lorenzino da Fermo. He then moved to Rome, where he chose painting over law studies. He painted in many Roman churches.

He painted in the style of Pietro da Cortona. Giuseppe Ghezzi was the first secretary in perpetuity for the Accademia di San Luca in Rome. He was the father of the more prominent caricaturist Pier Leone Ghezzi (born 28 June 1674). Another son, Placido, was protonotary apostolic.

On 10 December 1676, he borrowed a number of privately owned works by Venetian masters and exhibited them in the cloisters of San Salvatore in Lauro in Rome. He published a book of collected poems about art that describes an academic competition. Ghezzi died in Rome on 10 November 1721, aged 87. Among his disciples was Pietro da Pietri of Novara.

== Sources ==
- Farquhar, Maria (1855). Ralph Nicholson Wornum (ed.). Biographical catalogue of the principal Italian painters. London: Woodfall & Kinder. pp. 72–73.
