= Maria Ghezzi =

Italian illustrator (1927–2021)

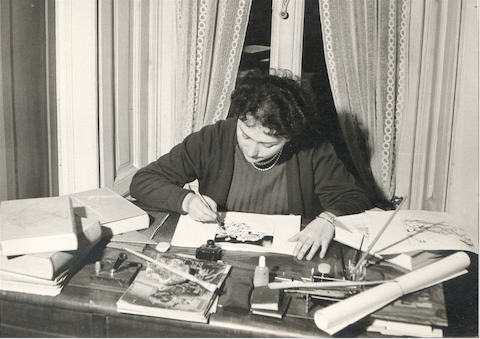
Maria Ghezzi

Maria Ghezzi (23 February 1927 in Bresso, Italy – 22 February 2021 in Milan) was an Italian designer, illustrator, and painter. She was a specialist in the design of the rebus of the Week Puzzles, to which she devoted her professional life. In the enigmatic field, she was known under the pseudonym La Brighella.

== Education and career ==
Ghezzi got her education for Brera Academy, Milian and later started working as Painter, and interior decorator.
