= Ippolito Ghezzi =

Italian composer and Augustinian friar

Ippolito Ghezzi (1650–1709) was an Italian composer and Augustinian friar. He was maestro di cappella at Montepulciano Cathedral from 1679 to 1700.

== Recordings ==
- Ippolito Ghezzi: Dialogie Sacri & Salmi a 2 Voci, Cappella Musicale di San Giacomo Maggiore in Bologna, Roberto Cascio 2CD Tactus
- Ippolito Ghezzi: Oratorios, Motets, Lamentations, Cappella Musicale di San Giacomo Maggiore in Bologna, Roberto Cascio 4CD Tactus
