= Comunanza =

- Comune
- Comune di Comunanza
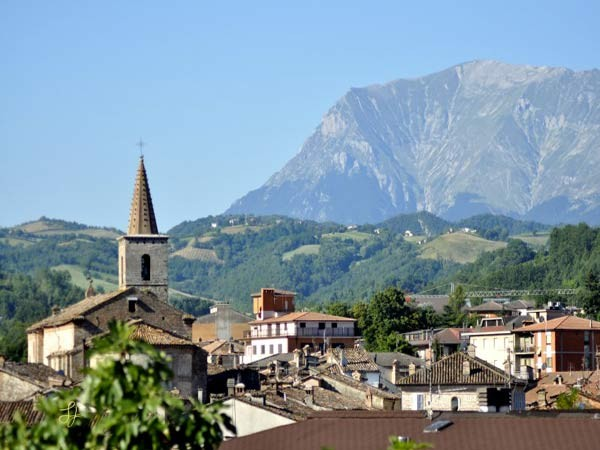

- Coat of arms

- Location within Italy Location within Marche
- Coordinates: 42°57′N 13°25′E
- Country: Italy
- Region: Marche
- Province: Ascoli Piceno (AP)

Government
  - Mayor: Alvaro Cesaroni

Area
  - Total: 54.4 km^{2} (21.0 sq mi)
- Elevation: 448 m (1,470 ft)

Population (30 June 2017)
  - Total: 3,102
  - Density: 57.0/km^{2} (148/sq mi)
- Demonym: Comunanzesi
- Time zone: UTC+1 (CET)
  - Summer (DST): UTC+2 (CEST)
- Postal code: 63087
- Dialing code: 0736
- Website: Official website

Comunanza is a comune (municipality) in Marche, Italy. It is a medieval village at the feet of the Monti Sibillini, founded in the 5th or 6th century by Ascoli refugees escaping barbaric incursions.

Sights include late-Romanesque church of Sant'Anna, and that of Santa Maria a Terme, built in the 9th century in sandstone above a Roman temple which belonged to the disappeared Roman settlement of Novana.
