= Archdiocese of Turin =

Roman Catholic archdiocese in Italy

Coordinates: 45.0733°N 7.6854°E

Archdiocese of Turin Archidioecesis Taurinensis Arcidiocesi di Torino

Catholic
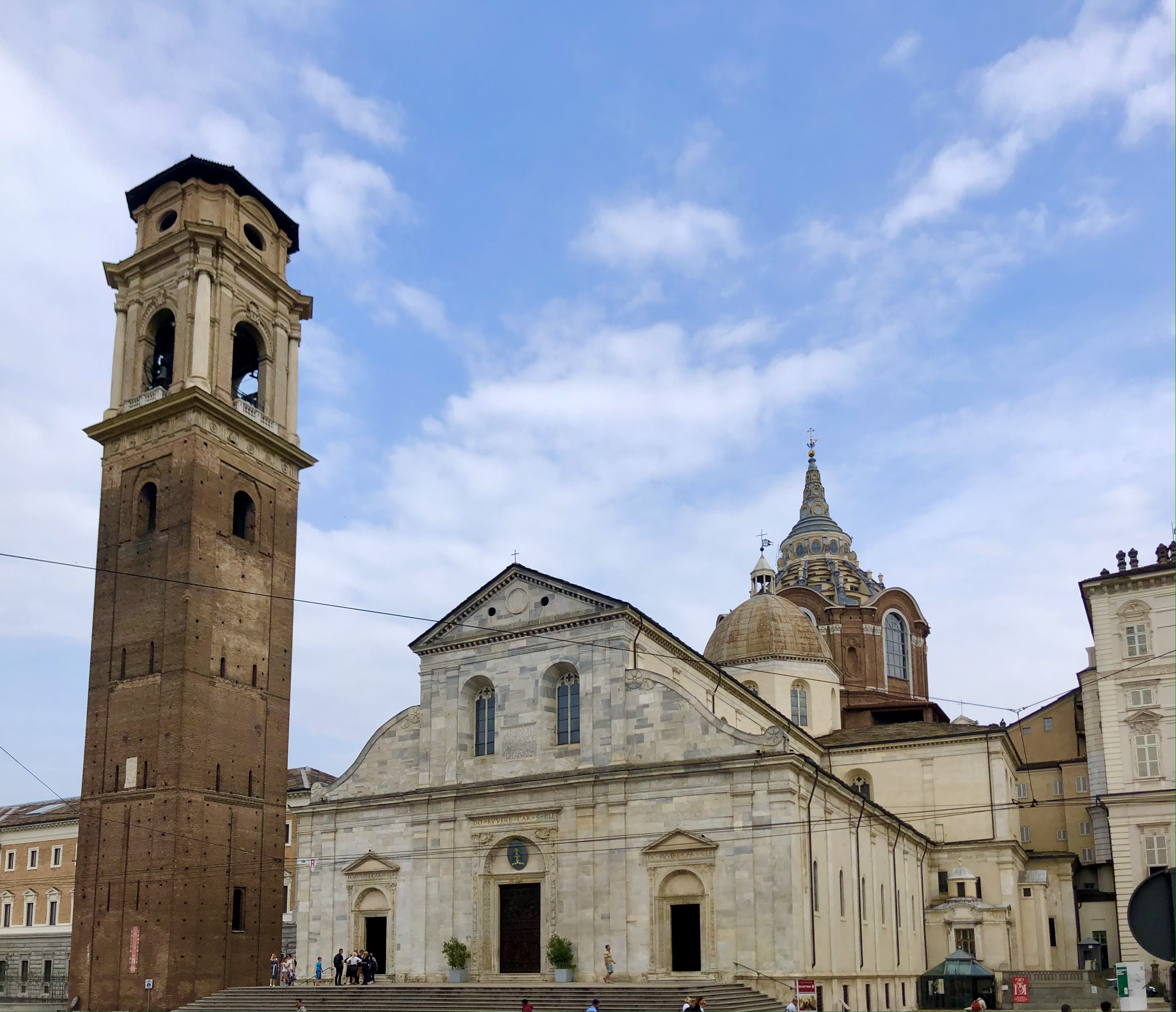
- Turin Cathedral

Location
- Country: Italy

Statistics
- Area: 3,350 km^{2} (1,290 sq mi)
- Population: Total; Catholics: (as of 2014); 2,153,000; 2,057,000 (95.5%)
- Parishes: 355

Information
- Denomination: Catholic Church
- Sui iuris church: Latin Church
- Rite: Roman Rite
- Established: 4th century
- Cathedral: Metropolitan Cathedral of Saint John the Baptist
- Secular priests: 520 diocesan 535 Religious Orders; 133 Permanent Deacons

Current leadership
- Pope: Leo XIV
- Archbishop: Roberto Repole
- Auxiliary Bishops: Alessandro Giraudo
- Bishops emeritus: Guido Fiandino

Map

Website
- www.diocesi.torino.it

The Archdiocese of Turin (Latin: Archidioecesis Taurinensis) is a Latin Church ecclesiastical territory of the Catholic Church in Italy.

The diocese of Turin was founded in the 4th century and elevated to the dignity of an archdiocese on 21 May 1515 by Pope Leo X. As a metropolitan archdiocese, it has as suffragan dioceses: Acqui, Alba, Aosta, Asti, Cuneo, Fossano, Ivrea, Mondovì, Pinerolo, Saluzzo and Susa. Its mother church is the Cathedral of Saint John the Baptist.

== History ==
The earliest bishop of Turin whose name has survived was Maximus of Turin. Fedele Savio argues that Maximus was the first bishop of Turin. Maximus, many of whose homilies are extant, died between 408 and 423.

Bishop Ursicinus (569–609) underwent captivity and loss of his property at the hands of the Franks. Pope Gregory I complained to Bishop Syagrius of Autun that someone else was made bishop in place of Ursicinus, in violation of canon law, and Ursicinus' diocese was taken away from him. It has been inferred that the Diocese of Moriana (Maurienne) was detached from that of Turin on this occasion.

Duke Garibold of Turin, who had assassinated the Lombard King Godebert in 662, was murdered in an act of revenge, in the Baptistry of S. Giovanni il Battisto in the Cathedral of Turin.

Other bishops were:

- Claudius of Turin (817–27), a copious and controversial writer, famous for his opposition to the veneration of images
- Regimirus (of uncertain date, in the 9th century), who established a rule of common life among his canons
- Amulo (880–98), who incurred the ill-will of the Turinese and was driven out by them; Gezo (1000), who founded the monastery of San Solutore in Turin
- Landulf (1037), who founded the Abbey of Cavour and repaired the damage inflicted on his church by the Saracen incursions
- Cunibert of Turin (1046–1080), to whom Peter Damian wrote a letter (Epistolae IV.iii) exhorting him to repress the laxity of his clergy in matters of clerical celibacy
- Boso (1122–c.1127), who resigned as a cardinal to become bishop.

In 1074, Bishop Cunibert of Turin (1046–1080) was summoned by Pope Gregory VII to attend a synod which was announced for 30 November in that year. One of the matters to be treated was the controversy between Cunibert and Abbot Benedict of S. Michele di Chiusa. The bishop claimed that the monastery was situated on allodial property of the diocese, and therefore the bishop had the right to install the abbot and collect the decima tax. On 12 December 1074, the Pope wrote again, in considerable anger, because Cunibert had refused to attend the synod (venire contempsit); the Pope further advised Cunibert that another synod was going to be held toward the end of February 1075, which he was warned he must attend, and in the meantime he was to stop disturbing the monastery. When the synod took place, Cunibert was suspended from office, and in a letter of 9 April 1075, Gregory again chastised him for breaking his promise and continuing to harass the monks of S. Michele. Cunibert was given until 11 November, the next synod meeting day, to reach a peaceable settlement with Benedict, or else to put in an appearance at the synod, where his case would be given final judgement. The case dragged on, however, and on 24 November 1078, after Cunibert finally appeared at the Papal Court, the Pope gave final judgement, requiring Cunibert to return whatever he had taken from the monks, and the monks likewise, under the supervision of the Bishops of Asti and Aqui and the Abbot of Fruttuaria. If the Bishop still wished to assert that the monastery had been built on land belonging to the diocese and was under his jurisdiction, he should come to the next synod and present his proofs; otherwise, he should hold his peace.

=== Two episcopal 'elections' ===
In 1243, Bishop Hugo (Uguccione) de Cagnola (1231–1243) abdicated the bishopric of Turin and became a Cistercian. Before he retired to a monastery (the house of the Cistercians in Genoa) though, he was required to administer his diocese until a successor was elected. On 15 November 1243, Pope Innocent IV ordered Hugo to see to the election of the Pope's Chamberlain, Nicholas, Provost of Genoa as the next Bishop of Turin. On 10 May 1244, Innocent ordered the Papal Legate Gregorio de Montelongo, Papal Subdeacon and Notary, to see to the election of the Abbot of San Gennaro near Trino in the diocese of Vercelli, Giovanni Arborio, as the next bishop of Turin.

=== An episcopal election ===
The episcopal election of 1319 is unusually well-attested. Bishop Teodisius Revelli (1301–1319) died in the Spring of 1319. The cathedral chapter met on 16 May to choose his successor. One of the electors, the Primicerius Thomas de Pellizonus, was ill and was the subject of threats on the part of some disaffected citizens of Turin, and was therefore unable to attend the meeting. He sent a notarized explanation of his absence by means of two procurators, Guilelmus de Cavaglata and Guido de Canalibus. The electoral assembly duly took place later that day, and de Canalibus was elected Bishop of Turin. An electoral statement was drawn up immediately, and carried to the home of de Pellizonus, who approved and ratified the election, still on 16 May. This too was written down and properly notarized. The documents indicate that Bishop Guido was the immediate successor of the late Bishop Teodisius.

Bishop Guido Canale had the task of annulling the marriage of Frederick of Saluzzo and Jacobina de Blandrata in 1333, on the grounds of affinity in the third degree. The matter needed to be repaired by papal bulls of Pope John XXII.

The bishops of Turin had a palace at Pinerolo, from which numerous surviving documents have been dated.

=== Creation of the archdiocese ===
On 21 May 1515, during the Tenth Session of the Fifth Lateran Council, Pope Leo X removed the diocese of Turin from metropolitan obedience of Milan, and made Turin an archiepiscopal see with the dioceses of Mondovì and Ivrea as its suffragans, other sees being added later. On the same day, the Pope sent a letter to Bishop Giovanni Francesco della Rovere, notifying him of his promotion to the rank of archbishop, and another to the new suffragans, notifying them of the creation of the archdiocese.

In the 16th century the diocese saw the rise the Waldensian sect and of Calvinism. It is known that, in the spring of 1536, John Calvin visited Aosta as he was returning to France from Ferrara. His preaching, however, brought him to the attention of Bishop Pietro Gazino of Aosta, and he was forced to flee. The Council of Trent called upon bishops everywhere to attempt to restore Roman Catholicism. Archbishop Girolamo della Rovere, in 1566, engaged in a public disputation with the Protestants of the Piedmont and was victorious, which was greeted with great satisfaction by the Duke. In 1567, he conducted a visitation of the valley of the Stura, and preached to and conversed with many Protestants who had come into Piedmont from France, again with some success. During his episcopacy, Duke Emanuele Filiberto brought to Turin from his castle in Chambéry the Holy Shroud, the personal property of his family, and, on 29 December 1590, the body of St Maurice, the martyr.

At the conclusion of the wars between France and Savoy with the Peace of Cateau Cambresis and the French withdrawal, in 1563 the permanent principal residence of the Dukes of Savoy became the city of Turin. The university was moved from Mondovì, where it had retreated during the French occupation. A Jesuit college was opened in Turin in 1567 with an annual subsidy from the Duke, and the Jesuit Collegio dei Nobili in 1572. In 1577, Archbishop della Rovere began the construction of the church Santi Martiri for the Jesuits in Turin.

Cardinal Gerolamo della Rovere died on 25 January 1592 while in conclave in Rome to elect a successor to Pope Innocent IX (Facchinetti).

From 1713 to 1727, owing to difficulties with the Holy See, the See of Turin remained vacant.

After 1848, Archbishop Luigi Fransoni (1832–62) became notable for his opposition to the Piedmontese government's reform program led by Camillo Benso, first as Minister of Agriculture, then as Minister of Finance, and finally in 1852, as Prime Minister of Savoy. At the same time the Risorgimento and the operations of Giuseppe Garibaldi had brought about a revolution in Rome, which drove Pope Pius IX into exile. Piedmontese policy called for a reform of the rights of the Catholic church, especially of the regular clergy. Fransoni's vocal reaction to these events and policies helped to stimulate the already widespread anticlericalism in Italy, and he found himself forced to leave Turin and Italy in 1852 for exile under French protection.

=== Cathedral and Chapter ===
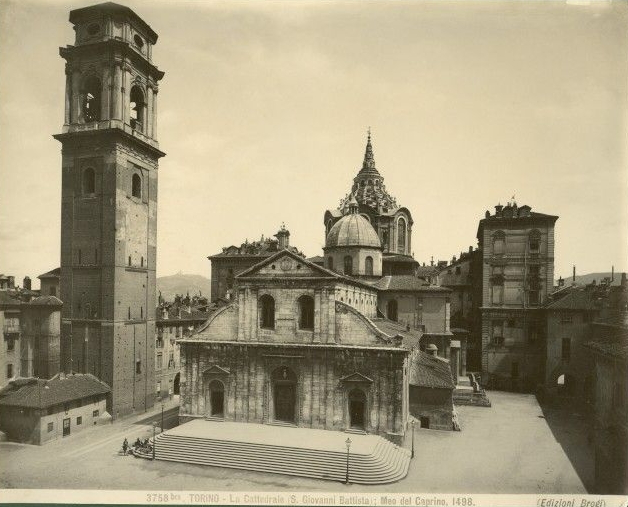
Cathedral of Turin

The circumstances of the founding of the original cathedral of Turin are obscure. It is conjectured that the building was the work of the first bishop, Maximus, which would place the date around the beginning of the 5th century. It was constituted of three interconnected churches, San Salvatore, San Giovanni Battista, and Santa Maria. Bishop Guido Canale (1319–1348) found it necessary to completely reconstruct the Chapel of San Michele in the cathedral, which he endowed.

With the old cathedral in a state of collapse, Bishop Domenico della Rovere (1482–1501) had the cathedral rebuilt in the 1490s, to designs by Meo (Amadeo) del Caprina da Settignano of Florence. Demolition began in May 1491. Cardinal della Rovere visited Turin in 1496 to inspect the progress of the works. The new cathedral was consecrated on 21 September 1505 by Bishop Giovanni Ludovico della Rovere.

The existence of a college of Canons in Turin is very old. A diploma of Emperor Henry III of 1047 attributes them to Bishop Regimir in the mid-ninth century. The Cathedral Chapter consisted of five dignities and twenty Canons and twenty prebends. The dignities were: the Provost, the Archdeacon, the Treasurer, the Archpriest, and the Primicerius (Cantor). In addition there were five officials called Trinitatis. The earliest known Provost was Walpert in 890. The earliest known Archdeacon was Ansprand, who signed a document in 863. The earliest known Archpriest was Erchempert, Sanctae Taurinensis Ecclesiae Archipresbyter Cardinalis. The earliest known Primicerius (Cantor) was Adalwert, who signed a document in 890 Sancte Taurinensis Ecclesie Diaconus Cardinalis Cantor. The Provost and Primicerius subscribe a document of Bishop Milo in 1185. The office of treasurer was established by a bull of Pope Sixtus IV of 15 January 1472. In 1690 there were twenty-nine canons. In 1744, there were six dignities and twenty canons.

In addition to the cathedral chapter, there were seven collegiate churches in the diocese, which had chapters of canons. At Carmagnola there was a chapter of an archpriest and nine canons. At Chieri, at S. Maria della Scala there were an archpriest, a cantor, and ten canons. In Courgnè there was a provost and six canons. In Giaveno, at San Lorenzo, there was a provost and eight canons. In Moncalieri, at Santa Maria della Scala, there was a chapter composed of a provost and six canons. At Santa Maria di Rivoli, there was a chapter composed of a provost, an archpriest, a cantor, and five canons. At Savigliano, at S. Andrea, founded in 1028, which was in charge of four parishes, there was a college of canons regular; Pope Clement XII secularized the canons, who were thereafter sixteen in number (of whom one was the penitentiary), presided over by an abbot, an archpriest and a primicerius.

=== Seminary ===
The seminary of the diocese of Turin was established by Cardinal Girolamo della Rovere on 4 June 1567, in accordance with the decrees of the Council of Trent. Since 1988, the seminary has been located in a building that once belonged to the Suore Fedele Compagne di Gesu. The old building became the Minor Seminary in 1992.

=== Synods ===
A diocesan synod was an irregularly held, but important, meeting of the bishop of a diocese and his clergy. Its purpose was:

1. to proclaim generally the various decrees already issued by the bishop;
2. to discuss and ratify measures on which the bishop chose to consult with his clergy;
3. to publish statutes and decrees of the diocesan synod, of the provincial synod, and of the Holy See.

The Diocese of Turin maintains a list of diocesan synods on its website.

The earliest known diocesan synod is that of Bishop Boso, who also attended a provincial synod in Milan in December 1125; no records survive. Another synod was held by Bishop Giovanni Arborio on 26 October 1246. Bishop Goffredo di Montanaro presided at a diocesan synod which was held in S. Salvatore de Domno on Wednesday, 14 May 1270. Bishop Goffredo presided over a second synod on 16 May 1276 in S. Salvatore de Domno; its acts survive. Synods also took place in 1332, 1335, 1339, 1351, 1368, 1403, 1428, 1448, 1465, 1467, 1469, and 1500. In 1502 a collection of twelve Constitutions of synods was published.

There were synods in 1514, 1575, 1597, 1606, 1608, 1610, 1614, 1624, and 1633.

A diocesan synod was held by Archbishop Giulio Cesare Bergera (1643–1660) in 1647. On 28 May 1670 Archbishop Michele Beggiamo (1662–1689) held a diocesan synod.

A synod was held by Archbishop Gian Francesco Arborio di Gattinara (1727–1743) on 1–3 May 1729. Archbishop Giambattista Roero di Pralormo (1744–1766) held his first diocesan synod on 21 and 22 April 1755. Archbishop Vittorio Maria Costa d'Arignano (1778–1796) held a diocesan synod on 20–22 August 1788.

Archbishop Lorenzo Gastaldi held several synods, in 1873, 1874, 1875, 1878, and 1880. There was then a lapse of more than a century, until Cardinal Giovanni Saldarini held one in 1994, and another in 1997. Since 2012, however, the diocese prefers to hold annual meetings, which are called an "Assemblea diocesana".

== Bishops of Turin ==
=== to 900 ===
- Maximus I (390 – 408/423)
- Maximus II (before 451 – after 465)
- Victor (attested 494)
- Tigridius (Tigridus) (attested 501, 502, 503)
- Rufus (before 562)
- Ursicinus (562 – 609)
- Rusticus (before 680 - 691)
- ? Valcuno (mentioned in 739?)
- Andreas (after 773 – c. 800)
- Claudius (c. 818 – 827)
- Witgerius (attested 832, 838)
- Regimirus (ninth century)
- Guglielmo I (c. 849)
- Claudius II (c. 873)

Lancius (mentioned in 887)

- Amulo (attested 880–898)

=== 900 to 1200 ===
- ? Eginolf (attested in 901)
- Guglielmo (before 906 – after 920)
- Ricolfus (mentioned in 945)
- Amalric (955–969)
- Amizo (989 – after 998)
- Gezo (after 998 – 1011)
- Landulf (1011–1037)
- Guido (1037–1046)
- Cunibertus (1046 – c. 1081)
- Vitelmo (c. 1081 – 1092)
- Guibert (Wibertus) (attested 1098, 1099)
- Mainard (Maginard) (1100–1117/8)
- Guibert II (mentioned in 1118)
- Boso (attested 1122, 1125)
- Arberto (mentioned in 1140)
- Oberto (1144 – after 1145)
- Carl I (1147–1162)
- Guglielmo (attested 1162, 1163)
- Carlo (1165–1169)
- Milo (attested 1170–1187)
- Arduino (1188–1207)

=== 1200 to 1515 ===
- Jacobus de Carisio (1207–1226)
- Jacobus (1227–1231)
- Hugo de Cagnola (1231–1243)
- Joannes Arborio (1244–1257)
- Gandolfus (1259–1260 ?)
- H( ), O.Min.
- Gaufridus de Montanaro (1264–1300)
- Teodisius Revelli (1301–1319)
- Guido Canale (1319–1348)
- Thomas de Sabaudia (1348–c. 1362)
- Bartholomeus de Roma (1362–1364)
- Giovanni Orsini de Rivalta (1365–1411)
- Aimo de Romagnano (1415–1438)
- Ludovicus de Romagnano (1438–1469)
- Giovanni Compresio (Compuys) (1469–1482)
- Cardinal Domenico della Rovere (1482–1501)
- Giovanni Ludovico della Rovere (1501–1510)
- Giovanni Francesco della Rovere (1510–1515–1516)

== Archbishops of Turin ==
- Giovanni Francesco della Rovere (1515–1516)

Cardinal Innocenzo Cybo (1516–1517) Administrator

- Claudio di Seyssel (1517–1520)

Innocenzo Cybo (1520–1548) Administrator

- Cesare Cybo (1548–1562)

Cardinal Innico d'Avalos d'Aragona, O.S. (1563–1564) Administrator

- Gerolamo della Rovere (1564–1592)
- Carlo Broglia (1592–1617)
- Filiberto Milliet (1618–1625)
- Giovanni Battista Ferrero, O.P. (1626–1627)

Sede vacante (1627–1632)

- Antonio Provana (1632–1640)
- Giulio Cesare Bergera (1643–1660)
- Michele Beggiamo (1662–1689)
- Michele Antonio Vibò (1690–1713)

Sede vacante (1713–1727)

- Gian Francesco Arborio di Gattinara, B. (1727–1743)
- Giambattista Roero (Rotario) di Pralormo (1744–1766)
- Francesco Luserna Rorengo di Rorà (1768–1778)
- Vittorio Maria Costa d'Arignano (1778–1796)
- Carlo Luigi Buronzo del Signore (1797–1805)
- Giacinto della Torre, O.E.S.A. (1805–1814)

Sede vacante (1814–1818)

- Columbano Chiaverotti, O.S.B.Cam. (1818–1831)
- Luigi Fransoni (1832–1862)

Sede vacante (1862–1867)

- Alessandro Riccardi di Netro (1867–1870)
- Lorenzo Gastaldi (1871–1883)
- Cardinal Gaetano Alimonda (9 Aug 1883 – 30 May 1891)
- Davide Riccardi (14 Dec 1891 – 20 May 1897)
- Cardinal Agostino Richelmy (1897–1923)
- Cardinal Giuseppe Gamba (1923–1929)
- Cardinal Maurilio Fossati (11 December 1930 – 30 March 1965)
- Cardinal Michele Pellegrino (18 Sep 1965 – 27 July 1977)
- Cardinal Anastasio Ballestrero (1 August 1977 – 31 January 1989)
- Cardinal Giovanni Saldarini (31 January 1989 – 19 June 1999)
- Cardinal Severino Poletto (19 June 1999 – 11 October 2010)
- Cesare Nosiglia (11 October 2010 – 19 February 2022)
- Cardinal Roberto Repole (19 February 2022 – present)

== Books ==
=== Reference works ===
- Gams, Pius Bonifatius (1873). Series episcoporum Ecclesiae catholicae: quotquot innotuerunt a beato Petro apostolo. Ratisbon: Typis et Sumptibus Georgii Josephi Manz. pp. 813–814. (in Latin)
- Eubel, Conradus, ed. (1913). Hierarchia catholica. Vol. Tomus 1 (second ed.). Münster: Libreria Regensbergiana. (in Latin)
- Eubel, Conradus, ed. (1914). Hierarchia catholica. Vol. Tomus 2 (second ed.). Münster: Libreria Regensbergiana. (in Latin)
- Gulik, Guilelmus (1923). Eubel, Conradus (ed.). Hierarchia catholica. Vol. Tomus 3 (second ed.). Münster: Libreria Regensbergiana. (in Latin)
- Gauchat, Patritius (Patrice) (1935). Hierarchia catholica. Vol. Tomus IV (1592-1667). Münster: Libraria Regensbergiana. (in Latin)
- Ritzler, Remigius; Sefrin, Pirminus (1952). Hierarchia catholica medii et recentis aevi V (1667-1730). Patavii: Messagero di S. Antonio.
- Ritzler, Remigius; Sefrin, Pirminus (1958). Hierarchia catholica medii et recentis aevi. Vol. Tomus VI (1730-1799). Patavii: Messagero di S. Antonio. (in Latin)
- Ritzler, Remigius; Sefrin, Pirminus (1968). Hierarchia Catholica medii et recentioris aevi sive summorum pontificum, S. R. E. cardinalium, ecclesiarum antistitum series... A pontificatu Pii PP. VII (1800) usque ad pontificatum Gregorii PP. XVI (1846) (in Latin). Vol. VII. Monasterii: Libr. Regensburgiana.
- Remigius Ritzler; Pirminus Sefrin (1978). Hierarchia catholica Medii et recentioris aevi... A Pontificatu PII PP. IX (1846) usque ad Pontificatum Leonis PP. XIII (1903) (in Latin). Vol. VIII. Il Messaggero di S. Antonio.
- Pięta, Zenon (2002). Hierarchia catholica medii et recentioris aevi... A pontificatu Pii PP. X (1903) usque ad pontificatum Benedictii PP. XV (1922) (in Latin). Vol. IX. Padua: Messagero di San Antonio. ISBN 978-88-250-1000-8.

=== Studies ===
- Casiraghi, Giampietro (1979). La diocesi di Torino nei medioevo. Biblioteca storica subalpina, 196 (in Italian). Turin: Deputazione subalpina di storia patria.
- Chiuso, Tomaso. "Saggio di antichi documenti dell' Archivio arcivescovile di Torino." In: Miscellanea di storia italiana Tomo XVIII (Torino: Fratelli Bocca 1889), pp. 421–522.
- Cross, F. L.; Livingstone, E. A., eds. (13 March 1997). The Oxford Dictionary of the Christian Church, 3rd edition. USA: Oxford University Press. p. 359. ISBN 0-19-211655-X.
- Kehr, Paul Fridolin (1914). Italia pontificia : sive, Repertorium privilegiorum et litterarum a romanis pontificibus ante annum 1598 Italiae ecclesiis, monasteriis, civitatibus singulisque personis concessorum. Vol. VI. pars ii. Berolini: Weidmann. pp. 79–139.
- Lanzoni, Francesco (1927). Le diocesi d'Italia dalle origini al principio del secolo VII (an. 604). Faenza: F. Lega; pp. 1044–1050. (in Italian)
- Savio, Fedele (1898). Gli antichi Vescovi d'Italia: il Piemonte (in Italian). Torino: Bocca. pp. 281–376.
- Schwartz, Gerhard (1907). Die Besetzung der Bistümer Reichsitaliens unter den sächsischen und salischen Kaisern: mit den Listen der Bischöfe, 951-1122. Leipzig: B.G. Teubner. (in German)
- Semeria, Giovanni Battista (1840). Storia della chiesa metropolitana di Torino (in Italian). Torino: Fontana.
- Ughelli, Ferdinando; Coleti, Niccolo (1719). Italia sacra, sive de episcopis Italiae et insularum adjacentium (in Latin). Vol. Tomus quartus (4) (2nd ed.). Venice: Apud Sebastianum Coleti. pp. 925–979.
- Tuninetti, Giuseppe; D'Antino, Gianluca (2000). Il cardinal Domenico Della Rovere, costruttore della cattedrale, e gli arcivescovi di Torino dal 1515 al 2000: stemmi, alberi genealogici e profili biografici (in Italian). Torino: Effata Editrice IT. ISBN 978-88-86617-54-3.
