= Theatre of Nero =

Ancient Roman theater in Rome

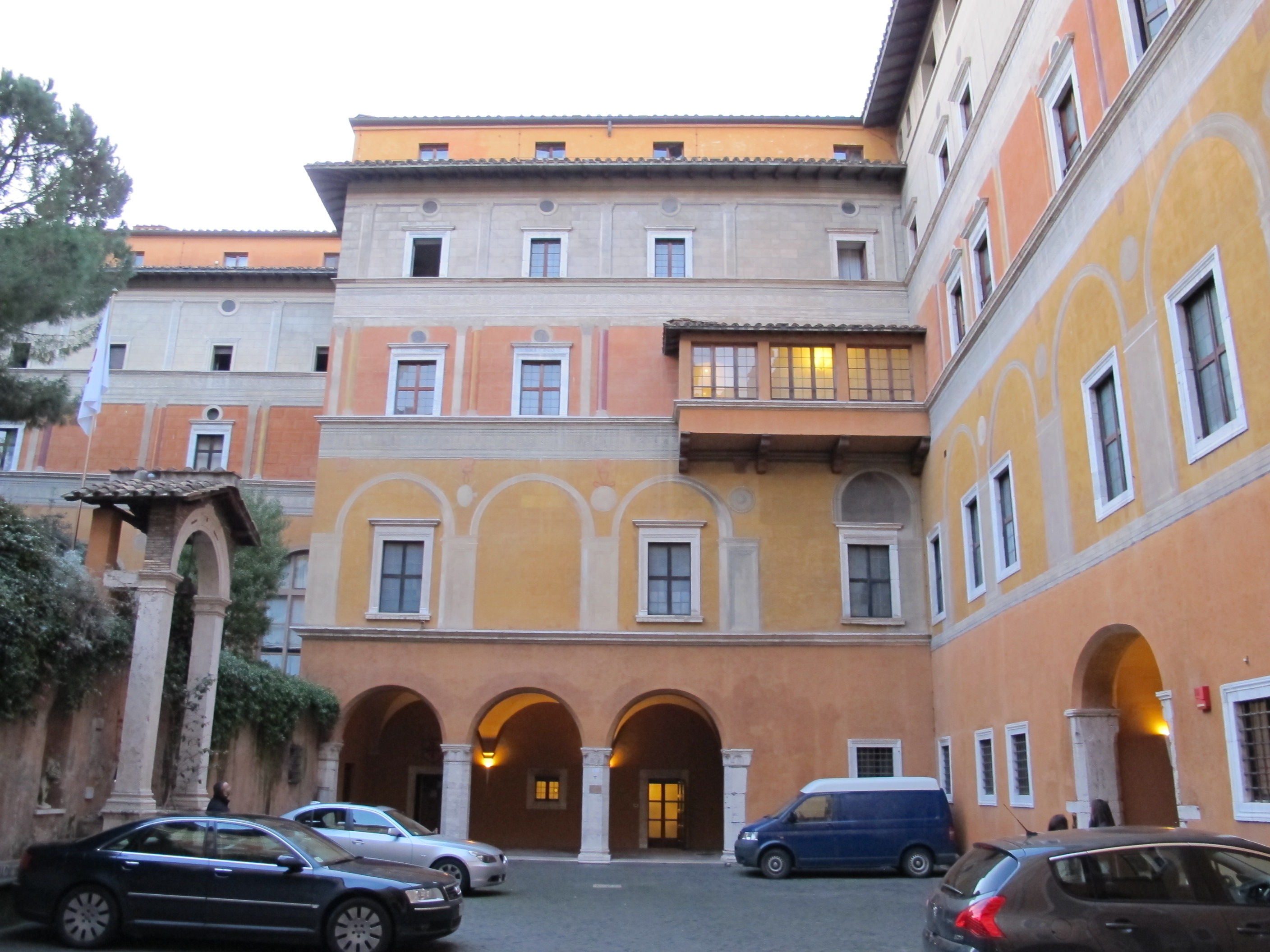
- The site of the theatre lies to the left in this view, under the upper courtyard of the Palazzo dei Penitenzieri.

- Shown within Augustan Rome
- Interactive map of Theatre of Nero
- 41°54′06″N 12°27′39″E
- Type: Roman theatre
- Location: Ager Vaticanus

History
- Built: 54–64 AD
- Built by: Nero

The Theatre of Nero (Latin: Theatrum Neronis) was the private theatre erected in Rome by Nero, the Roman emperor between AD 53 and AD 68.

It was known only from literary sources until its remains were discovered in 2020. The remains were excavated through 2023.

== Location ==
The theatre was located on the right bank of the Tiber in the Ager Vaticanus in the horti of Agrippina the Elder (inherited by her grandson Nero), the same area where Caligula had built his circus. Its remains are located in the courtyard of the renaissance Palazzo dei Penitenzieri, also named Palazzo Della Rovere, in the Borgo rione between Via della Conciliazione and Borgo Santo Spirito.

== History ==
The theatre is mentioned explicitly by Pliny the Elder and implicitly by Suetonius and Tacitus. According to Pliny, the emperor displayed the seized possessions of a former consul in his private theatre (theatrum peculiare). The theatre was used by Nero for rehearsals of his subsequent public singing performances in the theatre of Pompey and was large enough to satisfy his vanity when filled with people. Suetonius writes that during the Neronia festival the emperor promised to exhibit himself in hortis ("in the gardens"), an indirect reference to his theatre. Finally, Tacitus states that during the Juvenalia Nero sang per domum aut hortos, another hint to the building. It is also possible that the domestica scaena mentioned by Tacitus as the place from which Nero admired the Great Fire of Rome in 64 AD does not refer to the tower of Gaius Maecenas on the Esquiline Hill, but to the scene ("scaena") of his theatre. This, lying on the right bank of the Tiber, was well away from the affected areas and therefore a safe observation point, unlike the tower which was in the middle of the fire. At the beginning of the second century AD, the building was dismantled to recover its materials, as evidenced by five marble columns found in situ.

In the Middle Ages the area of the theatre became the site of handicrafts and activities related to the arrival of pilgrims, as evidenced by the discovery of moulds for rosaries, bone objects crafted to create musical instruments and furniture hinges, jugs, glass chalices used as liturgical furnishings and ceramic material, and two pilgrim insignia (showing the Holy Face of Lucca and Notre-Dame de Rocamadour). The theatre is mentioned last in the middle of the 12th century in the Mirabilia Urbis Romae, a pilgrims' guide of the city.

Around 1480 in the area of the theatre, Cardinal Domenico della Rovere began construction of Palazzo Della Rovere, possibly entrusting this work to Baccio Pontelli.

The remains of the theatre were found during excavations from 2020, under the direction of the special archaeological superintendence of monuments of Rome. The theatre's discovery was announced in July 2023 by Rome's superintendent Daniela Porro. Within the excavation, remnants of costumes, coloured glass goblets, pottery, and cooking utensils were found. Several road tracks were also found, connecting the site to the Portus Maior, the landing place on the Tiber downstream of Ponte Sant'Angelo.

== Architecture ==
Two buildings in opus latericium have been found under the courtyard of the Renaissance Palazzo della Rovere. They overlooked an open courtyard possibly surrounded by a portico. The buildings can be dated to the Julio-Claudian period by the stamps found on their bricks. The first building has a hemicycle plan, with radial entrances and stairs and can thus be identified with the cavea of the theatre for the tiers of seats. The scaenae frons was oriented toward the west with columns of the Ionic order, walls enrobed in white and coloured marble and stucco covered in gold leaf, as in the Domus Aurea. The second building on the other hand, perpendicular to the first, was used for service functions and housed perhaps the sets and costumes.

== Sources ==
- Callari, Luigi (1932). I Palazzi di Roma (in Italian). Roma: Ugo Sofia-Moretti.
- Castagnoli, Ferdinando; Cecchelli, Carlo; Giovannoni, Gustavo; Zocca, Mario (1958). Topografia e urbanistica di Roma (in Italian). Bologna: Cappelli.
- Liverani, Paolo (2000–2001). "Due note di topografia vaticana: il theatrum Neronis e i toponimi legati alla tomba di S. Pietro". Estratto Dai RENDICONTI della Pontificia Accademia Romana di Archeologia (in Italian). LXXIII. Città del Vaticano: Tipografia Vaticana.
- Liverani, Paolo: Neronis Theatrum. In: Lexicon Topographicum Urbis Romae. Suburbium. vol. 4, Quasar, Rom 2006, ISBN 88-7140-316-9, p. 91–92 (digital).
