= Solutor =

Italian Roman Catholic saint

Saints Solutor, Adventor and Octavius
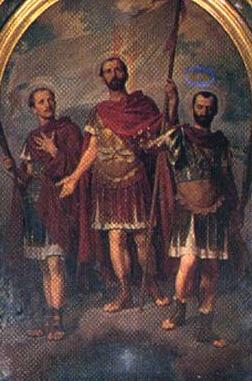
- Died: c. 284 AD
- Venerated in: Roman Catholicism; Eastern Orthodoxy; Oriental Orthodoxy; Lutheranism; Anglicanism
- Major shrine: Turin
- Feast: November 20; (archdiocese of Turin) January 20; anniversary of translation of his relics
- Attributes: Military attire
- Patronage: Turin

This article concerns Solutor of Turin. Solutor was also the name of a member of the group of martyrs, along with Valentine and Victor, who died at Ravenna around 305 AD.

Solutor, along with Octavius and Adventor (Italian: Solutore, Ottavio, e Avventore), (died ca. 284 AD) is the patron saint of Turin.

Historical detail regarding these martyrs is sparse; their memory is preserved because the three were mentioned in a sermon by Maximus of Turin. However, Maximus makes no precise geographic or temporal references regarding Solutor, Octavius, and Adventor.

Their legend states that they were members of the Theban Legion during the end of the 3rd century. While the legion's leader, Saint Maurice, was killed at Agaunum, along with many other soldiers, Solutor, Adventor, and Octavius managed to escape. Adventor and Octavius, however, were caught at the Dora Riparia and killed there. Solutor would be killed at a quarry near the Dora Baltea near Caravino. A matron of Ivrea collected their bodies in a quadriga and carried them to Turin.

== Veneration ==
In 490, Victor of Turin, bishop of the city, enlarged the church that housed their relics. In 1006, a monastery, San Solutore in Turin, was established by Bishop Gezo of Turin. The relics of the three martyrs, together with those of Saint Juliana and Saint Gozzelino (Goslino), second abbot of San Solutore, were transferred to the Turinese sanctuary known as the Consolata after Francis I of France ordered the demolition of San Solutore. In 1619, the relics were translated to the new church of the Holy Martyrs (Santi Martiri) on the Via Garibaldi. This church was built with the support of the Piedmontese pontiff Pius V and Emmanuel Philibert. The relics are still found at this church.

According to legend, a vision of the Virgin Mary appeared in a dream to John Bosco in 1844 or 1845 and revealed the site of the martyrdom of Adventor and Octavius. The Basilica dell'Ausiliatrice was built on the spot.

The cult of Saint Solutor is particularly strong in the diocese of Ivrea, and he is also venerated in Caravino, Romano Canavese, and Strambino.

The codex called the Codice della Catena depicts Saints Octavius, Maximus of Turin, Adventor, Solutor, John the Baptist, and Secundus of Asti.
