= Horti Agrippinae =

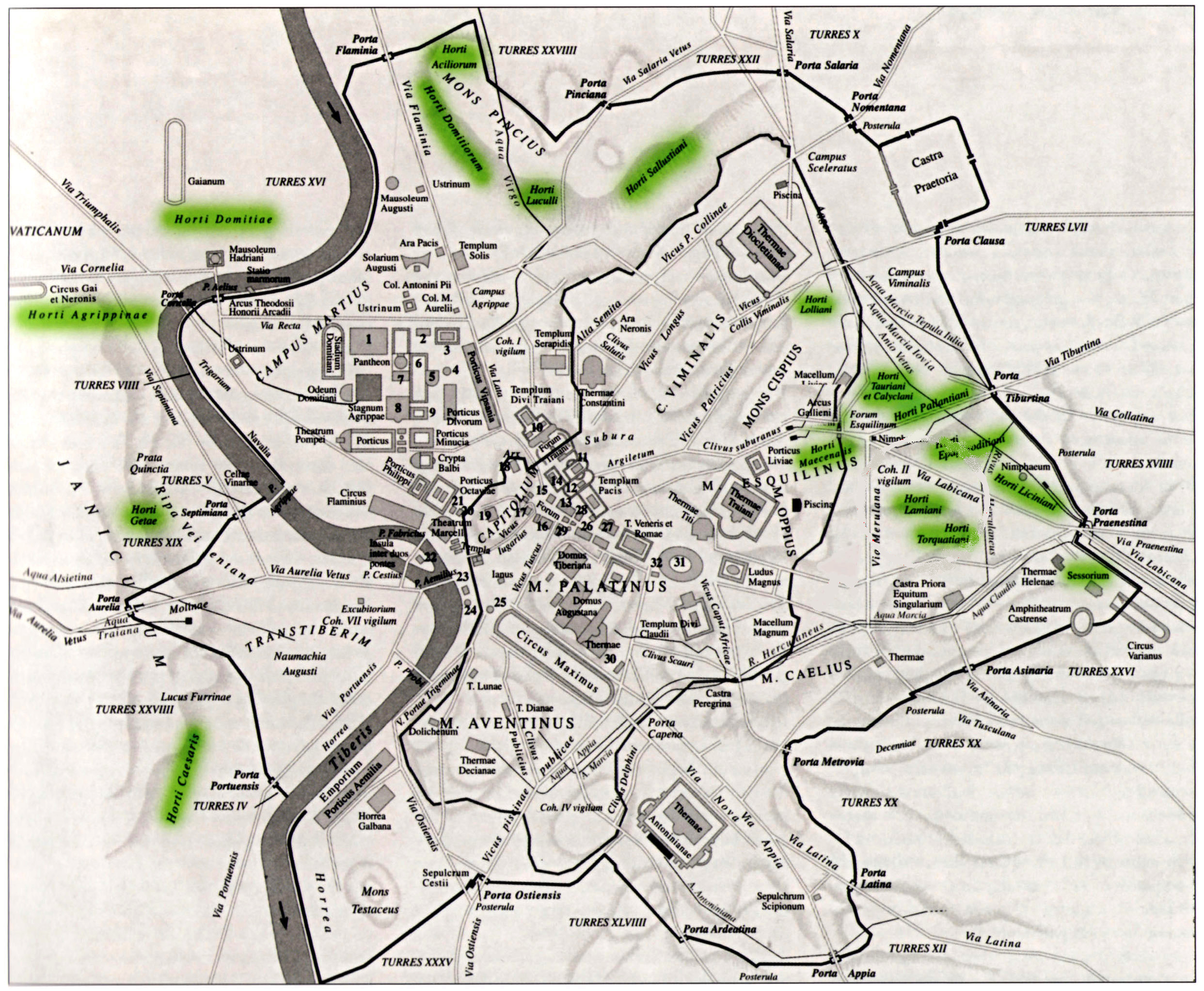
Horti of ancient Rome

The Horti Agrippinae (Gardens of Agrippina) was a luxurious villa-estate belonging to Agrippina the Elder in ancient Rome. It was located on the west bank of the river Tiber where St. Peter's Basilica is now, and extended to the river where a terrace with a portico was built.

It was built on the Ager Vaticanus, the alluvial plain outside the city walls which was developed at the end of the first century BC, allowing patrician families to construct luxurious private residences (Horti).

Her son Caligula inherited the horti and as a chariot racing enthusiast he built the so-called Circus of Nero there. After the Great Fire of Rome in 64 AD, Nero had the first Christians persecuted and (presumably) executed in these horti. One of them was the Apostle Peter, who was crucified in the circus. He was buried in the nearby necropolis on Via Cornelia and in the centuries that followed his tomb became a place of pilgrimage. In 324, Constantine the Great therefore had the first St. Peter's Basilica built on the grounds of the Horti Agrippinae and on the circus.

The horti also included the Theatre of Nero, excavated from 2021 to 2023 in the courtyard of the Palazzo dei Penitenzieri.

== See also ==
- Roman gardens

== Bibliography ==
- http://penelope.uchicago.edu/Thayer/E/Gazetteer/Places/Europe/Italy/Lazio/Roma/Rome/_Texts/PLATOP*/horti.html
