= Siegfried (bishop of Piacenza) =

Italian bishop (died 1031)

Siegfried, also Sigefred or Sigifredo (died 14 April 1031), was the bishop of Piacenza from 997 until his death. He was a loyal and rewarded participant in the imperial church system and a notable builder in the city of Piacenza.

== Family ==
Born into a Lombard family, Siegfried was the son of Rotofred and Constantina. His father's brothers were Archbishop John X of Ravenna and Otto, a patron of the monastery of San Savino in Piacenza. He was also related to bishops John II of Lucca and Cunibert of Turin, and the scholar Anselm of Besate. Anselm writes of Siegfried as a saint.

== Life ==
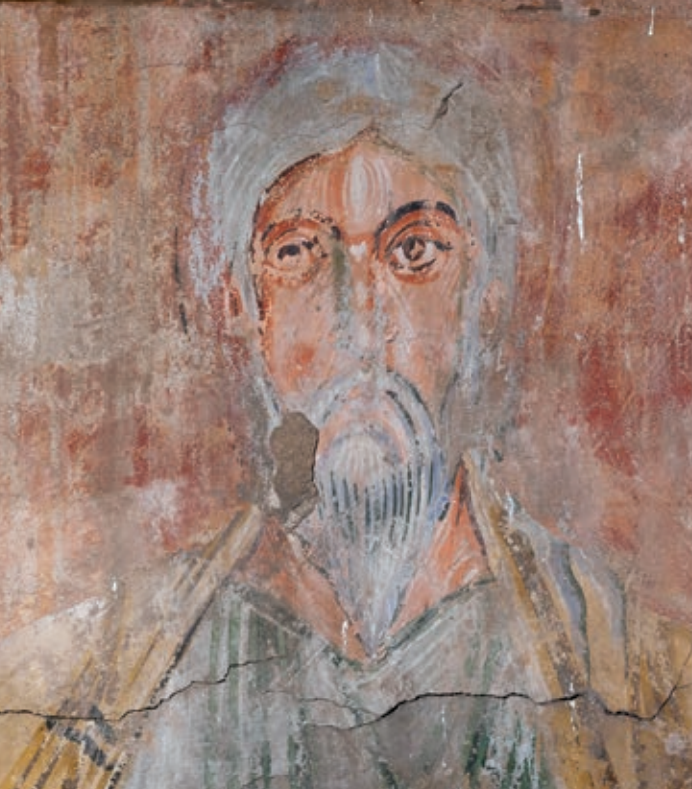
Romanesque painted figure on plaster, probably an Old Testament patriarch, from Siegfried's reconstruction of Sant'Antonio.

10th-century capital re-used by Siegfried in his reconstruction of San Savino and still visible in the crypt today

The see of Piacenza has been raised to an archdiocese and detached from the authority of the metropolitan of Ravenna by Pope John XV in 988 for the benefit of John Philagathos. It has been suggested that Sigulf, a "man of good character" (vir bonae indolis) who, according to the Annals of Quedlinburg, had his election as bishop of Piacenza quashed to make way for Philagathos, was the same person as Siegfried.

After Philagathos was elected antipope in opposition to Gregory V, Gregory declared Piacenza vacant on 7 July 997 and demoted it back to a diocese under Ravenna. Siegried was invested as the new bishop. He traveled to Eschwege to meet Otto III, who granted Piacenza various privileges on 17 July. Otto detached the city from the county of Piacenza and granted the civil authority (districtum) in the city and its suburbs as far as one mile outside the walls to Siegfried.

In February 998, Gregory V confirmed the right to free election of San Savino, founded in 903. This seems to have been done to strengthen Siegfried, who was regarded as an ally by Otto III, who had entered Italy with an army to depose John XVI earlier that year. In 1005, according to Giovanni de' Mussi, Siegfried rebuilt San Savino outside the city walls. The present structure is mostly a rebuild of 1107 with later modifications. Siegfried reused some elements from the 903 edifice, of which two capitals in the crypt remain. Of his own work, part of the apse and the campanile remain.

Siegfried also rebuilt the basilica of Sant'Antonio, which he dedicated on 20 March 1014 in a public ceremony attended prominent local figures, including Count Lanfranc. For this he chose the form of a oriented basilica with a western nave and a campanile. The roof, the church bells and probably the original interior decoration was completed in his time. Unlike in the case of San Savino, the existing exterior of Sant'Antonino is largely what Siegfried built. The paintings, however, have not survived in good condition.

A document of 1123 refers to Siegfried as the "founder" of cathedral of Santa Giustina. The relics of Saint Justina were transferred to Piacenza by Philagathos, but Siegfried held a formal procession to receive them in their final resting place on 17 August 1001. While most sources make this the cathedral, Pietro da Ripalta's Chronica Placentina records that Justina was first placed in the neighbouring church of San Giovanni de Domo, presumably because the cathedral was being renovated at the time. Around 1006, Siegfried also commissioned a written account in Latin of the transfer of the relics, the Translatio beatae Iustinae.

== Death ==
Various sources give different dates for Siegfried's death, but it took place on 14 April 1031. The necrology of the cathedral records it under that date with the words presul ab hac vita Sigefredus ab ethere migrat: "the prelate Siegfried migrated from this life to the aether". The necrology of San Savino gives the same year.

== Bibliography ==
- Ashworth, E. (1892). "Basilican and Greek Churches". Transactions of the Exeter Diocesan Architectural Society. New Series. 5: 208–215.
- Arnaldi, Girolamo (1982). "Codagnello, Giovanni". Dizionario Biografico degli Italiani, Volume 26: Cironi–Collegno (in Italian). Rome: Istituto dell'Enciclopedia Italiana. pp. 562–568. ISBN 978-88-12-00032-6.
- Canetti, Luigi (2000). "Giovanni XVI, antipapa". Dizionario Biografico degli Italiani, Volume 55: Ginammi–Giovanni da Crema (in Italian). Rome: Istituto dell'Enciclopedia Italiana. ISBN 978-88-12-00032-6.
- Cowdrey, H. E. J. (1972). "Anselm of Besate and Some North-Italian Scholars of the Eleventh Century". Journal of Ecclesiastical History. 23 (2): 115–124.
- Jensen, Brian Møller (2006). "Did Bishop Siegfried Write This Text? Analysis and Edition of Translatio sanctae Iustinae". Medieval Liturgical Texts in Italian Manuscripts. Edwin Mellen Press. pp. 85–104.
- Jensen, Brian Møller, ed. (2012). The Story of Justina and Cyprian of Antioch as Told in a Medieval Lectionary from Piacenza: Edition with Introduction and Translation. Acta Universitatis Stockholmiensis.
- Longhena, Mario; Levi Spinazzola, Alda; Pettorelli, Arturo; Parigi, Luigi; De Marinis, Tammaro; Carotti, Natale (1935). "Piacenza". Enciclopedia Italiana. Rome: Istituto dell'Enciclopedia Italiana.
- Moehs, Teta E. (1972). Gregorius V, 996–999: A Biographical Study. Stuttgart: Anton Hiersemann.
- Musajo Somma, Ivo (2011). "Una Chiesa dell'impero salico: Piacenza nel secolo XI" (PDF). Reti Medievali Rivista. 12 (2): 103–150.
- Porter, A. Kingsley (1912a). "San Savino at Piacenza, I: History and Structure". American Journal of Archaeology. 16 (3): 350–367.
- Porter, A. Kingsley (1912b). "San Savino at Piacenza, II: Ornament, Conclusions". American Journal of Archaeology. 16 (4): 495–517.
- Resnick, Irven M. (1996). "Anselm of Besate and Humanism in the Eleventh Century". Journal of Medieval Latin. 6: 1–11.
- Scirea, Fabio (2019). "L'epilogo del progetto di Sigifredo vescovo: il decoro dipinto in S. Antonino a Piacenza" (PDF). Hortus Artium Medievalium. 25 (2): 452–468.
