= Vitelmo (bishop of Turin) =

Italian bishop

Vitelmo of Turin or William of Turin (also Guglielmo) (died 1092) was an Italian bishop. He was bishop of Turin from c. 1082 until his death in 1092.

== Biography ==
Vitelmo may have been the son of Vitelmo-Bruno of the Baratonia, a powerful viscount in Turin. Vitelmo was appointed bishop of Turin by Henry IV. According to the contemporary chronicler, William of Chiusa, Vitelmo paid a large sum of money in return for his office.

Like many of his predecessors, Vitelmo made donations to the monastery of Santa Maria in Cavour, which had been founded by Bishop Landulf of Turin.

Vitelmo also continued the conflict with Abbot Benedict II (r.c.1066-1091) of the monastery of San Michele della Chiusa, which had begun under Bishop Cunibert of Turin.

== Notes ==
Catholic Church titles
Preceded by Cunibert of Turin	Bishop of Turin; 1082–1092	Succeeded by Guibert of Turin
