= Guibert =

Guibert is a given name and surname, and may refer to:

Given name

- Saint Guibert or Wicbert (892-962 AD), hermit and founder of Gembloux Abbey
- Guibert of Ravenna (or Wibert of Ravenna; c. 1029–1100), Italian Roman Catholic archbishop of Ravenna, elected Antipope Clement III
- Guibert of Gembloux (10th century), founder of the Abbey of Gembloux
- Guibert of Nogent (c. 1055–1124), Benedictine author and theologian
- Guibert of Tournai (13th century), Franciscan theologian
- Maistre Guibert Kaukesel, or Hubert Chaucesel (fl. c. 1230–55), French trouvère from Arras
- Guibert of Cors (died 1258), French knight and Baron of Mitopoli in the Principality of Achaea

Surname

- André Guibert (1886-1966), French psychiatrist and psychoanalyst
- Andres Guibert (born 1968), Cuban basketball player
- Élisabeth Guibert (1725–1788), French writer
- Emmanuel Guibert (born 1964), French comic artist and writer
- Georges Guibert (1915–1997), French Roman Catholic missionary in Senegal and Réunion
- Hervé Guibert (1955-1991), French author
- Jacques-Antoine-Hippolyte de Guibert (1743–1790), French soldier, civil-military theorist
- Joseph-Hippolyte Guibert (1802–1886), French archbishop
- Maurice Guibert (1856–1913), French photographer, friend of Henri de Toulouse-Lautrec
- Nicolas Guibert (c. 1547 – c. 1620), French critic of alchemy
- Rita Guibert (1916-2007), American author, journalist and translator

== Other uses ==
- 33335 Guibert, a minor planet discovered on 11 November 1998 at ODAS
- Mont-Saint-Guibert, a Walloon municipality located in the Belgian province of Walloon Brabant.
