= John X (archbishop of Ravenna) =

John X, known as Giovanni da Besate ('John of Besate') or Giovanni Vincenzo ('John Vincent'), was the archbishop of Ravenna from 983 until 998.

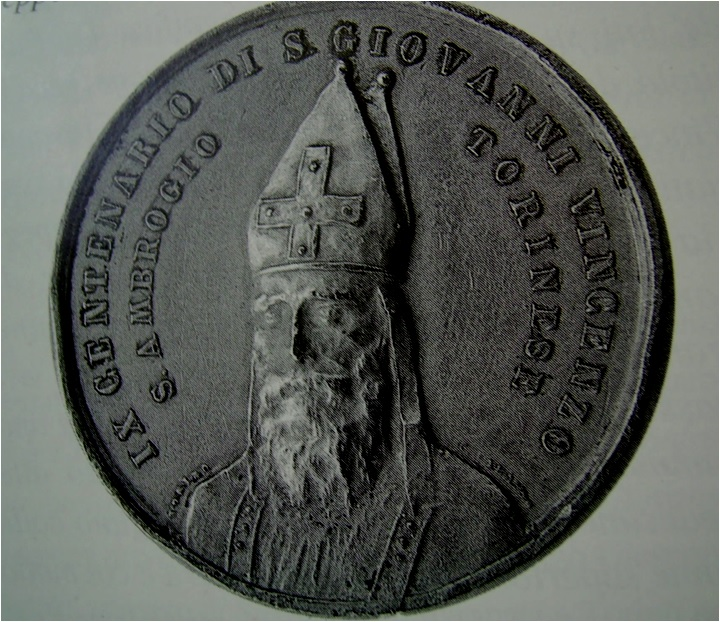
Medallion minted on the supposed ninth centenary of his death in 1900

John belonged to a prominent family from Besate in Lombardy. His brothers were Rotofred, the father of Bishop Sigifred of Piacenza, and Otto, a patron of the monastery of San Savino in Piacenza. He was also related to Bishops John II of Lucca and Cunibert of Turin, and to the scholar Anselm of Besate.

Prior to becoming archbishop, John was attached to the cathedral of Pavia. He also lived as a hermit for a time, following Romuald of Ravenna.

John was elected to succeed Honestus as archbishop. Not long after his election, John travelled to Aachen to jointly crown the young Otto III with Archbishop Willigis of Mainz on 25 December 983. Otto had been elected king of Germany and Italy at a diet in Verona in May, although his father, Emperor Otto II, retained the real power. John X's participation in the coronation, as a representative of Italy, is unique in the history of the Holy Roman Empire.

In 988, Pope John XV detached the diocese of Piacenza from the archdiocese of Ravenna and made it an archdiocese for John Philagathos. Pope Gregory V visited Ravenna in late 996 or early 997. He confirmed the archdiocese's privileges. John X then accompanied him to the synod he had convoked in Pavia for February. After Philagathos was elected antipope, Gregory nullified the elevation of Piacenza, returned it to the jurisdiction of Ravenna and declared it vacant on 7 July 997. John X's brother Sigifred was then elected bishop. John was granted further privileges by the pope.

The last mention of John in the sources is dated March 998. His death is not recorded, but the archdiocese was vacant shortly afterwards, since Otto III engineered the election of Gerbert of Aurillac, who was invested with the see on 28 April 998.

== Bibliography ==
- Althoff, Gerd (2003) [1996]. Otto III. Translated by Phyllis G. Jestice. Pennsylvania State University Press.
- Cowdrey, H. E. J. (1972). "Anselm of Besate and Some North-Italian Scholars of the Eleventh Century". Journal of Ecclesiastical History. 23 (2): 115–124.
- Huschner, Wolfgang [in German] (2003). "Erzbischof Johannes von Ravenna (983–998), Otto II. und Theofanu". Quellen und Forschungen aus italienischen Archiven und Bibliotheken. 83: 1–40.
- Moehs, Teta E. (1972). Gregorius V, 996–999: A Biographical Study. Stuttgart: Anton Hiersemann.
- Musajo Somma, Ivo (2011). "Una Chiesa dell'impero salico: Piacenza nel secolo XI" (PDF). Reti Medievali Rivista. 12 (2): 103–150.
- Resnick, Irven M. (1996). "Anselm of Besate and Humanism in the Eleventh Century". Journal of Medieval Latin. 6: 1–11.
- Schoolman, Edward M. (2016). Rediscovering Sainthood in Italy: Hagiography and the Late Antique Past in Medieval Ravenna. Palgrave Macmillan.
- West-Harling, Veronica (2020). Rome, Ravenna, and Venice, 750–1000: Byzantine Heritage, Imperial Present, and the Construction of City Identity. Oxford University Press. doi:10.1093/oso/9780198754206.001.0001.
- Violante, Cinzio (1993). "L'immaginario e il reale: i «da Besate», una stirpe feudale e «vescovile» nella genealogia di Anselmo il Peripatetico e nei documenti". In Cinzio Violante (ed.). Nobiltà e chiese nel Medioevo e altri saggi: Scritti in onore di Gerd Tellenbach. Jouvence. pp. 97–157.

Catholic Church titles
Preceded by Honestus	Archbishop of Ravenna; 983–998	Succeeded by Gerbert of Aurillac
