= Giovanni Ludovico della Rovere =

Italian Roman Catholic prelate

Most Reverend Giovanni Ludovico della Rovere
- Bishop of Turin
- Church: Catholic Church
- Diocese: Diocese of Turin
- In office: 1503–1510
- Predecessor: Domenico della Rovere
- Successor: Giovanni Francesco della Rovere

Personal details
- Died: 1510

Giovanni Ludovico della Rovere (died 1510) was a Roman Catholic prelate who served as Bishop of Turin (1503–1510).

== Biography ==
On 8 November 1497, Giovanni Ludovico della Rovere was appointed during the papacy of Pope Alexander VI as Coadjutor Bishop of Turin. In 1503, he succeeded to the bishopric. He served as Bishop of Turin until his death in August 1510.

== External links and additional sources ==
- Cheney, David M. "Archdiocese of Torino {Turin}". Catholic-Hierarchy.org. (for Chronology of Bishops) ^{[self-published]}
- Chow, Gabriel. "Metropolitan Archdiocese of Torino (Italy)". GCatholic.org. (for Chronology of Bishops) ^{[self-published]}

Catholic Church titles
Preceded by Domenico della Rovere	Bishop of Turin; 1503–1510	Succeeded by Giovanni Francesco della Rovere
