= Giovanni Battista Ferrero =

Roman Catholic prelate and Archbishop of Turin

Most Reverend Giovanni Battista Ferrero
- Archbishop of Turin
- Church: Catholic Church
- Archdiocese: Archdiocese of Turin
- In office: 1626–1627
- Predecessor: Philibert François Milliet de Faverges
- Successor: Antonio Provana

Personal details
- Born: 1576 Pinerolo, Italy
- Died: 10 July 1627 (age 51)

Giovanni Battista Ferrero, O.P. (1576–1627) was a Roman Catholic prelate who served as Archbishop of Turin (1626–1627).

== Biography ==
Giovanni Battista Ferrero was born in Pinerolo, Italy in 1576 and ordained a priest in the Order of Preachers. On 7 September 1626, he was appointed during the papacy of Pope Urban VIII as Archbishop of Turin. He served as Archbishop of Turin until his death on 10 July 1627.

== External links and additional sources ==
- Cheney, David M. "Archdiocese of Torino {Turin}". Catholic-Hierarchy.org. (for Chronology of Bishops) ^{[self-published]}
- Chow, Gabriel. "Metropolitan Archdiocese of Torino (Italy)". GCatholic.org. (for Chronology of Bishops) ^{[self-published]}

Catholic Church titles
Preceded by Philibert François Milliet de Faverges	Archbishop of Turin; 1626–1627	Succeeded by Antonio Provana
