= Guido (bishop of Turin) =

Italian bishop

Guido of Turin (died 1046) was an Italian bishop. He was bishop of Turin from 1037 until his death in 1046.

According to a forged diploma, Emperor Conrad II supposedly awarded the bishopric of Maurienne to the bishop of Turin during the first year of Guido's episcopate.

Guido had a special care for the monastery of Santa Maria in Cavour, which his predecessor, Bishop Landulf of Turin, had founded. In 1041 Guido confirmed Landulf's donations to Cavour, and also intervened to ensure that Adelaide of Turin ceded property to the monastery. Then, in 1044, Guido donated the church of San Secondo, located near the Dora Riparia river, to Abbot Alberic of Cavour.

== Notes ==
Catholic Church titles
Preceded by Landulf of Turin	Bishop of Turin; 1037–1046	Succeeded by Cunibert of Turin
