= Mainard (bishop of Turin) =

Italian bishop

Mainard of Turin (also Maginard and Meinhard) (died 10 September 1117 or 1118) was an Italian bishop. He was bishop of Turin from 1100 until his death.

Mainard made donations to the monastery of San Solutore in Turin and the house of canons at San Lorenzo in Oulx in Turin.

Alongside Margrave Boniface del Vasto, Mainard tried unsuccessfully to settle a long-running dispute between the monastery of San Pietro in Turin and the sons of Viscount Vitelmo-Bruno of Baratonia (located c.21 km north-west of the city of Turin). The dispute was about the control of tithes in Scarnafigi.

== Notes ==
Catholic Church titles
Preceded by Guibert I	Bishop of Turin; 1100–1117/8	Succeeded by Guibert II
