= Gezo (bishop of Turin) =

Italian Priest

Gezo of Turin (died 1011) was an Italian bishop. He was bishop of Turin from 1000 until his death in 1011.

In 1006 Gezo founded the monastery of San Solutore in Turin, which was dedicated to saints Solutor, Octavius and Adventor, who were the patrons of the city of Turin. Also in 1006 Gezo was present – at the request of Pope John XVIII – at the consecration of the Abbey of Fruttuaria, alongside other bishops from the region.

== Notes ==
Catholic Church titles
Preceded by Amizo of Turin	Bishop of Turin; 1000–1011	Succeeded by Landulf of Turin
