= Semi-Gods Ceiling =

Painting by Pinturicchio

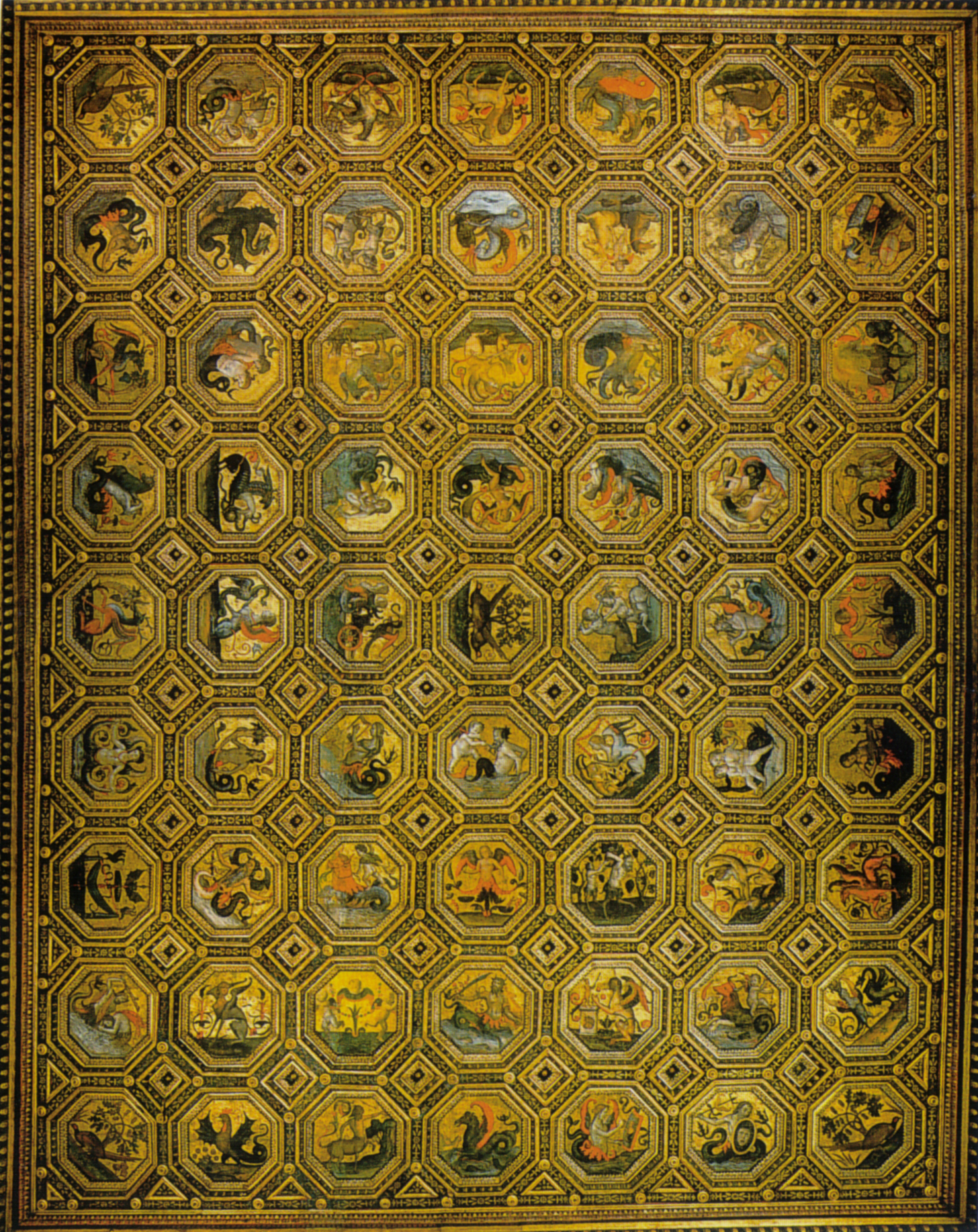
View of the ceiling.

The Demi-Gods Ceiling is a painted coffered ceiling by the Italian Renaissance master Pinturicchio, dating to c. 1490 and housed in the last of the suite of reception rooms in the Palazzo dei Penitenzieri in Rome, Italy. It comprises 63 octagonal coffers in gilded wood, decorated with allegoric and mythological figures on a faux-mosaic background, and painted on paper.

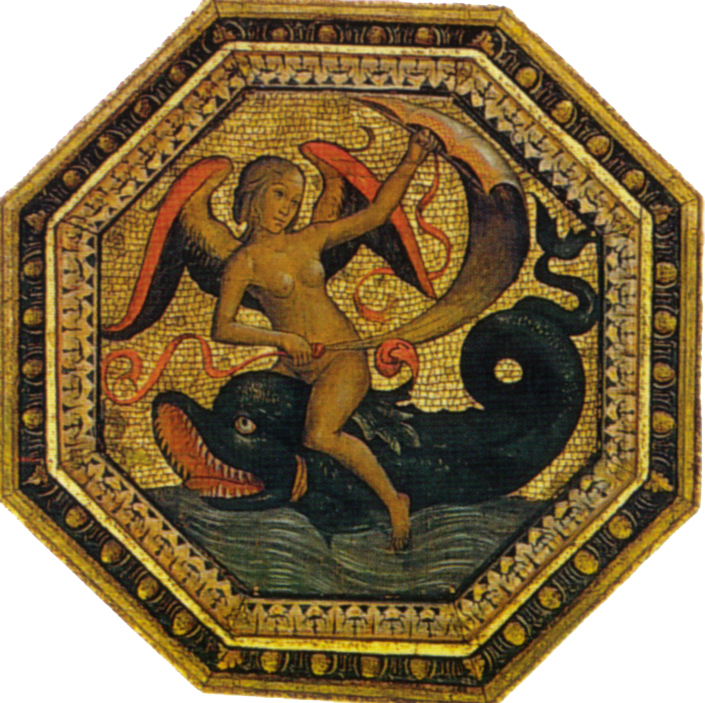
Detail of the Fortune.

The work was commissioned by Cardinal Domenico della Rovere, at the time patron of the young Pinturicchio.

== Description ==
The figures of the ceiling were inspired by medieval bestiaries and libri monstrorum, which contained hybrid figures such as sphinxes, armed tritons, satyrs, dragons, sirens and centaurs. The theme has hidden philosophical and humanist meanings, perhaps suggested by the literati who formed the cardinal's court.

In the center is the genealogical tree of the Della Rovere with two peacocks, which can be seen also at the corners. One of the representations is a nude allegory of Fortune, who rides a dolphin, differently from contemporary Florentine depictions in which she is portrayed on a small boat. There is also a putto on two sea horses going in different directions, a Neoplatonic allegory of the human soul, divided between Good and Evil, according to Marsilio Ficino's 1475 comments to Plato's Symposium. The Weighing of the Soul and the Eagle Defeating the Snake are ancient themes which had been syncretized by the Christian world.

Numerous depictions are of sea creatures, including sirens with two tails, painted while breastfeeding, painting or executing acrobatic dances. They were inspired by the sea thiasus featured in Roman sarcophagi and which was also used by Andrea Mantegna, whom perhaps Pinturicchio met in the building of the Belvedere Palace in the Vatican.

== Sources ==
- Acidini, Cristina (2004). "Pintoricchio". Pittori del Rinascimento. Florence: Scala. ISBN 88-8117-099-X.
