= Philibert François Milliet de Faverges =

Most Reverend Philibert François Milliet de Faverges
- Archbishop of Turin
- Church: Catholic Church
- Archdiocese: Archdiocese of Turin
- In office: 1618–1624
- Predecessor: Carlo Broglia
- Successor: Giovanni Battista Ferrero
- Previous posts: Titular Bishop of Hierapolis in Isauria (1590–1591); Bishop of Saint-Jean-de-Maurienne (1591–1618)

Personal details
- Born: 15 November 1564 Faverges, France
- Died: 17 November 1624 (age 60) Turin, Italy

Philibert François Milliet de Faverges (1564–1624) was a Roman Catholic prelate who served as Archbishop of Turin (1618–1624), Bishop of Saint-Jean-de-Maurienne (1591–1618), and Titular Bishop of Hierapolis in Isauria (1590–1591).

== Biography ==
Philibert François Milliet de Faverges was born in 15 November 1564 in Faverges, France. On 4 April 1590, he was appointed during the papacy of Pope Sixtus V as Titular Bishop of Hierapolis in Isauria and Coadjutor Bishop of Saint-Jean-de-Maurienne. He succeeded to the bishopric on 6 May 1591. On 17 December 1618, he was appointed during the papacy of Pope Paul V as Archbishop of Turin. He served as Archbishop of Turin until his death on 17 November 1624 in Turin, Italy.

== Episcopal succession ==
While bishop, he was the principal consecrator of:

- Charles Bobba de Montferrat, Bishop of Saint-Jean-de-Maurienne (1619);
- Jean-François de Sales, Titular Bishop of Chalcedon and Coadjutor Bishop of Geneva (1621);
- Francesco Sperelli, Titular Bishop of Constantina and Coadjutor Bishop of San Severino (1621);
- Antonio Provana, Archbishop of Durrës (1623);

and the principal co-consecrator of:

- Ercole Vaccari, Archbishop of Rossano (1619);
- Isidoro Pentorio, Bishop of Asti (1619);
- Agostino Solaro di Moretta, Bishop of Fossano (1621); and
- Sébastien Le Bouthilier, Bishop of Aire (1621).

== External links and additional sources ==
- Cheney, David M. "Hierapolis in Isauria (Titular See)". Catholic-Hierarchy.org. (for Chronology of Bishops) ^{[self-published]}
- Cheney, David M. "Diocese of Saint-Jean-de-Maurienne". Catholic-Hierarchy.org. (for Chronology of Bishops) ^{[self-published]}
- Chow, Gabriel. "Diocese of Saint-Jean-de-Maurienne (France)". GCatholic.org. (for Chronology of Bishops) ^{[self-published]}
- Cheney, David M. "Archdiocese of Torino {Turin}". Catholic-Hierarchy.org. (for Chronology of Bishops) ^{[self-published]}
- Chow, Gabriel. "Metropolitan Archdiocese of Torino (Italy)". GCatholic.org. (for Chronology of Bishops) ^{[self-published]}

Catholic Church titles
Preceded by Georg Waldeisen	Titular Bishop of Hierapolis in Isauria; 1590–1591	Succeeded by Johann Konrad von Gemmingen
Preceded by Pierre de Lambert	Bishop of Saint-Jean-de-Maurienne; 1591–1618	Succeeded by Charles Bobba de Montferrat
Preceded by Carlo Broglia	Archbishop of Turin; 1618–1624	Succeeded by Giovanni Battista Ferrero
