= Giovanni Francesco della Rovere =

Most Reverend Giovanni Francesco della Rovere
- Archbishop of Turin
- Church: Catholic Church
- Archdiocese: Archdiocese of Turin
- In office: 1515–1517
- Predecessor: Giovanni Ludovico della Rovere
- Successor: Innocenzo Cibo
- Previous post: Bishop of Turin (1504–1515)

Personal details
- Died: 1517 Turin, Italy

Giovanni Francesco della Rovere (died 1517) was a Roman Catholic prelate who served as Archbishop of Turin (1515–1517) and Bishop of Turin (1504–1515).

== Biography ==
Giovanni Francesco was the son of Stefano della Rovere and Luchina Grosso della Rovere. He was the first archbishop of Turin, as well as nephew of the previous bishop of Turin (great-grandson of Pope Julius II). Descendant of one of the most illustrious families of the Piedmontese and Italian nobility, he had a cultured education focused on an ecclesiastical career. Around the age of twenty he received priestly ordination.

On 10 May 1504, Giovanni Francesco della Rovere was appointed during the papacy of Pope Julius II as Coadjutor Bishop of Turin. In August 1510, he succeeded to the bishopric. On 21 May 1515, he was named during the papacy of Pope Leo X as Archbishop of Turin after the diocese was elevated. He served as Archbishop of Turin until his death in 1517.

== External links and additional sources ==
- Cheney, David M. "Archdiocese of Torino {Turin}". Catholic-Hierarchy.org. (for Chronology of Bishops) ^{[self-published]}
- Chow, Gabriel. "Metropolitan Archdiocese of Torino (Italy)". GCatholic.org. (for Chronology of Bishops) ^{[self-published]}

Catholic Church titles
Preceded by Giovanni Ludovico della Rovere	Bishop of Turin (1504–1515); Archbishop of Turin (1515–1517)	Succeeded by Innocenzo Cibo
