= Domenico della Rovere =

Italian cardinal and patron of the arts

His Eminence Domenico della Rovere
- Cardinal-Priest of San Vitale (1478-79); San Clemente (1479-1501)
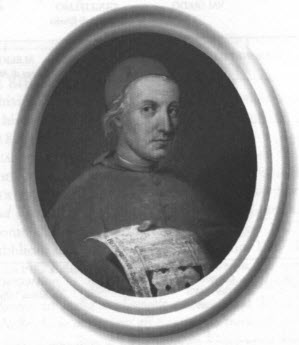

Orders
- Consecration: 1478
- Created cardinal: 10 February 1478 by Pope Sixtus IV
- Rank: Cardinal-Priest

Personal details
- Born: 1442 Vinovo
- Died: 23 April 1501 Rome
- Buried: Duomo di Torino, Turin
- Denomination: Roman Catholic

Domenico della Rovere (1442 – 23 April 1501) was an Italian cardinal and patron of the arts.

== Life ==
He was born in Vinovo, near Turin, and was not a relative of Pope Sixtus IV (Francesco Della Rovere), who, however, favoured him in the hope of establishing a link between his humble Ligurian family and that of the Piedmontese counts of Vinovo.

In 1478 he was appointed as Bishop of Tarantaise succeeding his brother, Cristoforo. In the same year, on 10 February, he was created cardinal of San Vitale by Sixtus IV (one year later he exchanged the title with that of San Clemente). Also in 1478, he received the title of bishop of Montefiascone and Corneto, which he kept until his death. On 19 July 1482 he was appointed Apostolic Administrator of the diocese of Geneva, during the Sede vacante following the death of Joannes Ludovicus de Sabaudia. He was transferred to the diocese of Turin on 24 July 1482, only five days later, when the Bishop of Turin, Jean de Compoys, was transferred to Geneva.

In 1483, he laid the cornerstone for the new cathedral of S. Margherita in Montefiascone, and in his Last Will and Testament in 1501 he left money to continue the work, which had barely reached the level of the main floor of the church at the time of his death.

After Sixtus' death in 1484, he went to Rome to participate in the papal conclave, which elected Pope Innocent VIII. Della Rovere remained in Rome for most of the rest of his life, leaving the diocese of Turin in the hands of his vicars and procurators, including his nephew Giovanni Ludovico della Rovere. In Piedmont, he funded the Collegiate church of Saluzzo and the rebuilding of the Turin Cathedral, as well as a new castle in Vinovo to serve as his residence. In Piazza Scossacavalli, in the Borgo rione of Rome, he commissioned Pinturicchio the decoration (including the Semi-Gods Ceiling) of the Palazzo bearing his name, whose construction he had started in 1480, perhaps under design by Baccio Pontelli.

He died in Rome on 22 April 1501, having made his Last Will and Testament earlier on the same day, before lunch. He is now buried in the Turin Cathedral.

Catholic Church titles
Preceded by Cristoforo della Rovere	Cardinal-Priest of San Vitale; 1478–1479	Succeeded by Ferry de Clugny
Preceded by Cristoforo della Rovere	Archbishop of Tarentaise; 1478	Succeeded by Giovanni de Compesio
Preceded by Gisberto Tolomei	Archbishop (Personal Title) of Corneto e Montefiascone; 1478–1501	Succeeded by Alessandro Farnese
Preceded by Giacopo Antonio Venier	Cardinal-Priest of San Clemente; 1479–1501	Succeeded by Jaime Serra i Cau
Preceded by Jean de La Rochetaillée	Archbishop (Personal Title) of Genève; 1482	Succeeded by Giovanni de Compesio
Preceded by Giovanni de Compesio	Archbishop (Personal Title) of Turin; 1482–1501	Succeeded by Giovanni Ludovico della Rovere
