= Amizo (bishop of Turin) =

Italian bishop

Amizo of Turin (died 1000) was an Italian bishop. He was bishop of Turin from 966 until his death in 1000. Based on an early modern Milanese chronicle, it is sometimes argued that Amizo was the son of Arduin Glaber of Turin.

Sometime between 983 and 987, Amizo consecrated abbey of Sacra di San Michele, founded by Hugh of Montboissier. In 989 Amizo granted the parish of S. Maria di Quadraciana to the nuns at San Pietro in Turin, enriching them with property at Scarnafigi and Cervignasco. Amizo obtained two imperial diplomas confirming the church of Turin in all its possessions: the first was issued by Otto II in 981, and the second by Otto III in 998. In 997 Amizo participated in the synod of Pavia, presided over by Pope Gregory V.

== Notes ==
Catholic Church titles
Preceded by Amalric of Turin	Bishop of Turin; 966–1000	Succeeded by Gezo of Turin
