= Palazzo Della Rovere =

Palace in Rome, Italy

- Palazzo dei Penitenzieri
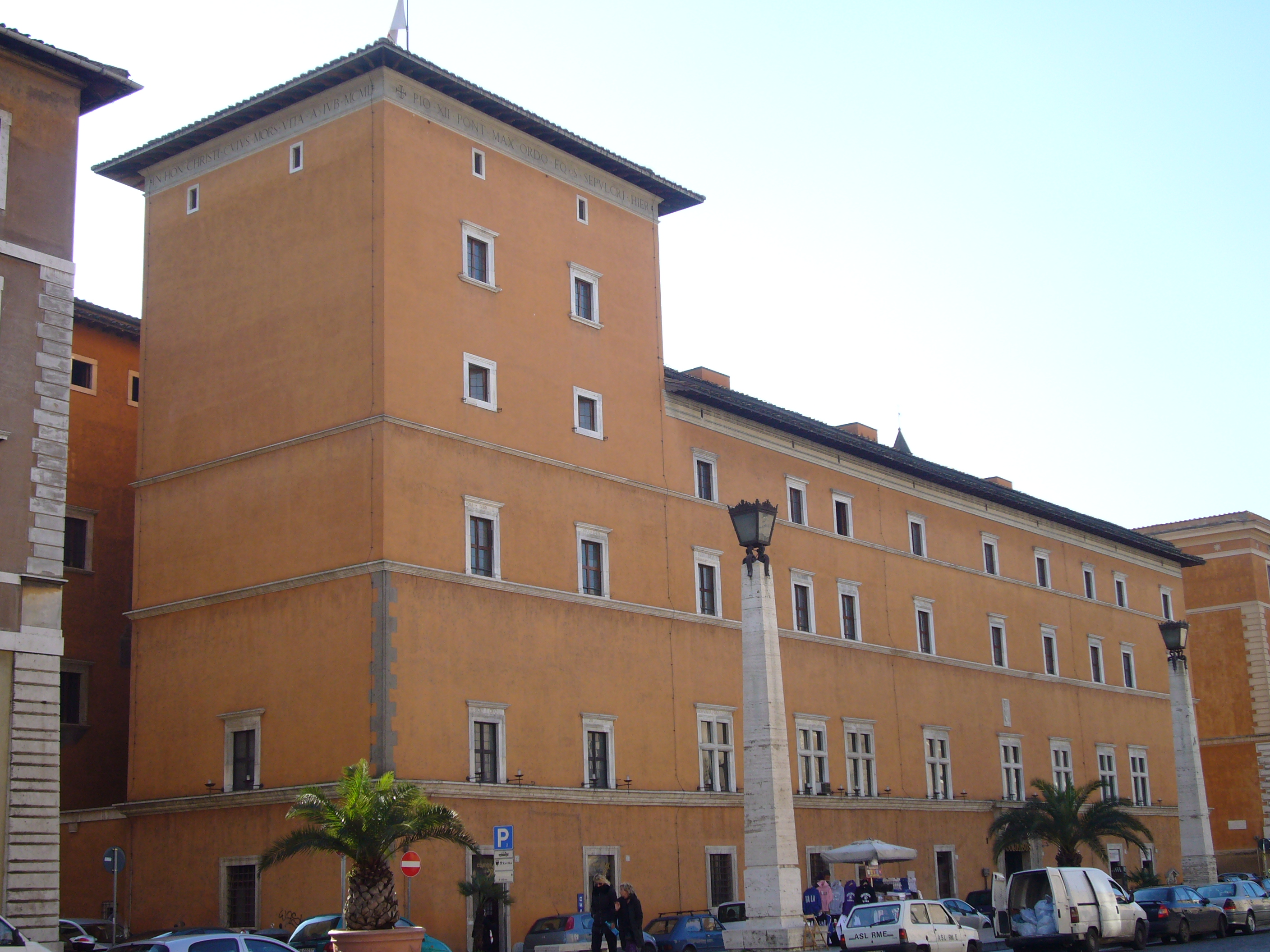
- Palazzo dei Penitenzieri
- Interactive map of the Palazzo Della Rovere area

General information
- Architectural style: Renaissance
- Location: Rome, Italy
- Coordinates: 41°54′07″N 12°27′40″E
- Construction started: 1480
- Completed: 1490

Palazzo Della Rovere (Palace of the Della Rovere family) is a palace in Rome, Italy, facing Via della Conciliazione. It is also known as Palazzo dei Penitenzieri.

== History ==
The construction of the palace was started in 1480 by cardinal Domenico della Rovere, a relative of Pope Sixtus IV della Rovere, perhaps under the design of the Florentine architect Baccio Pontelli. The palazzo was built between 1480 and 1490 on the south side of Piazza Scossacavalli, destroyed in 1937 together with the spina di Borgo; Pontelli modelled it closely on the architectural style of Palazzo Venezia, the most important building in 15th century Rome. Five halls of the piano nobile, with important frescoes and ceilings, are now the official reception rooms of the Equestrian Order of the Holy Sepulchre of Jerusalem.

The current name was added during the reign of Pope Alexander VII, who moved here the confessors working in Saint Peter's Basilica, known as penitenzieri. It formerly housed the Hotel Columbus and it is still the headquarters of the Order of the Holy Sepulchre. The Four Seasons hotel chain is the new tenant of the palace.

== Description ==
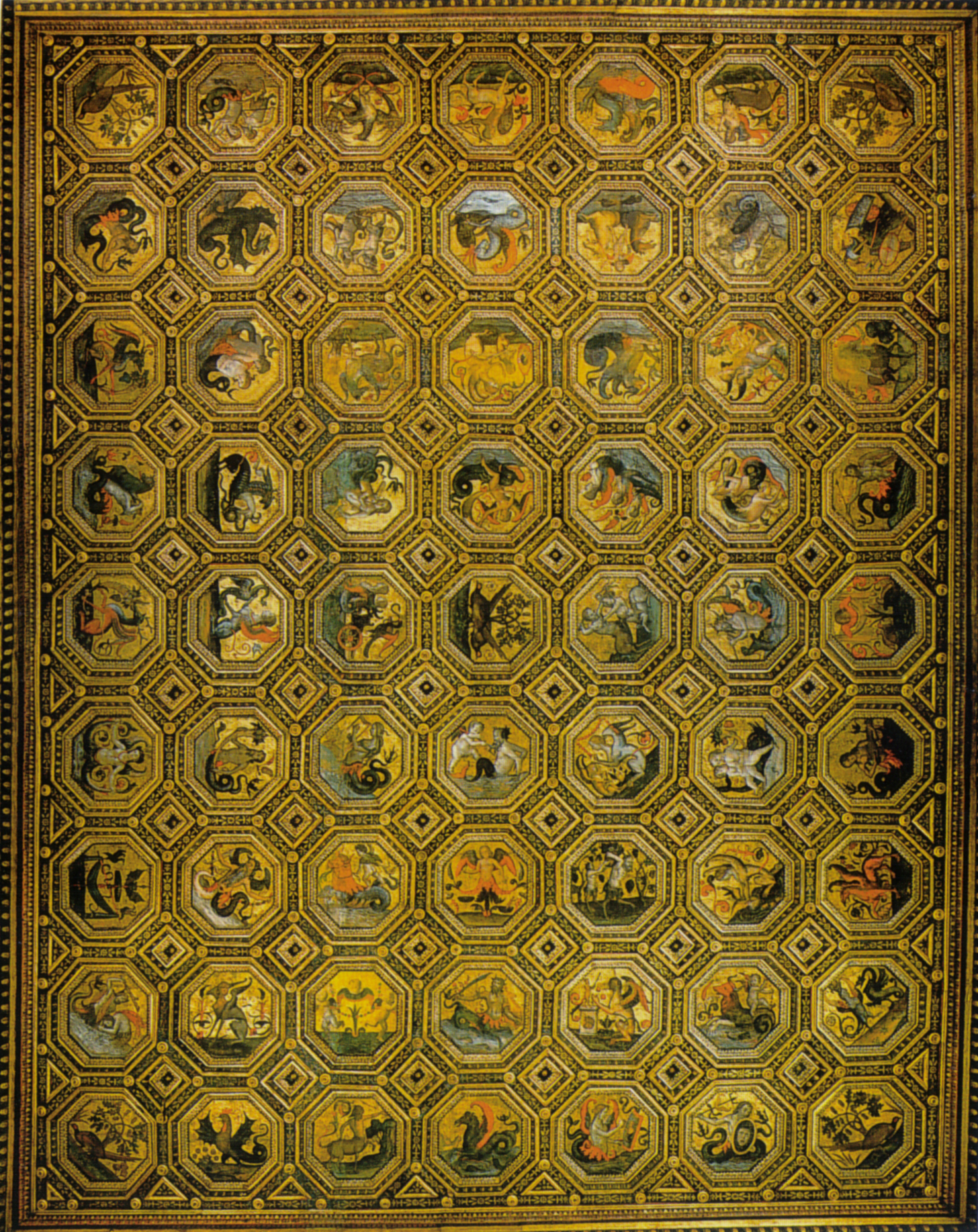
Semi-Gods Ceiling.

The building has a massive façade, inspired by that of Palazzo Venezia, with a tower on the northeast corner. The name of Domenico della Rovere is written on the windows of the first floor, while the coat of arms on the façade is that of Pope Clement XIV.

The interior has a court on two levels: a lower one with a portico featuring octagonal pillars and a pit, and an upper one with gardens. The palace has a rich internal decoration, the main rooms frescoed with fictive architecture. Part of the external painting, also representing fictive architecture, has survived. The most notable feature is the Semi-Gods Ceiling, a gallery of mythological and allegorical figures painted by Pinturicchio around 1490.

In July 2023, archaeologists announced the discovery of the remains of the Theatre of Nero under the building's courtyard and gardens.

== Books ==
- Aurigemma, Maria Giulia & Cavallaro, Anna (1999). Il Palazzo di Domenico della Rovere in Borgo. Roma: Istituto Poligrafico e Zecca dello Stato, Libreria dello Stato, 1999. ISBN 8824036856, 9788824036856
- Kehl, Pia (1993). "Il palazzo dei Penitenzieri in Borgo," in: Laura Dal Prà (ed.), I Madruzzo e l'Europa 1539–1658. I principi vescovi di Trento tra Papato e Impero, (Trent: Provincia Autonoma and Milan: Charta, 1993).
- Roma. Milan: Touring Club Editore. 1999. ISBN 88-365-1324-7.
