= Carlo Broglia =

Archbishop of Turin (1552–1617)

Most Reverend Carlo Broglia
- Archbishop of Turin
- Church: Catholic Church
- Archdiocese: Archdiocese of Turin
- In office: 1592–1617
- Predecessor: Girolamo della Rovere
- Successor: Philibert François Milliet de Faverges

Orders
- Consecration: 30 November 1592 by Agostino Valier

Personal details
- Born: 16 September 1552 Chieri, Italy
- Died: 8 February 1617 (age 64) Turin, Italy

Carlo Broglia (1552–1617) was a Roman Catholic prelate who served as Archbishop of Turin (1592–1617).

== Biography ==
Carlo Broglia was born in Chieri, Italy, on 16 September 1552. On 20 November 1592, he was appointed during the papacy of Pope Clement VIII as Archbishop of Turin. On 30 November 1592, he was consecrated bishop by Agostino Valier, Bishop of Verona. He served as Archbishop of Turin until his death on 8 February 1617.

== External links and additional sources ==
- Cheney, David M. "Archdiocese of Torino {Turin}". Catholic-Hierarchy.org. (for Chronology of Bishops) ^{[self-published]}
- Chow, Gabriel. "Metropolitan Archdiocese of Torino (Italy)". GCatholic.org. (for Chronology of Bishops) ^{[self-published]}

Catholic Church titles
| Preceded by Girolamo della Rovere | Archbishop of Turin; 1592–1617 | Succeeded by Philibert François Milliet de Faverges |
