= Antonio Provana =

Most Reverend Antonio Provana
- Archbishop of Turin
- Church: Catholic Church
- Archdiocese: Archdiocese of Turin
- In office: 1632–1640
- Predecessor: Giovanni Battista Ferrero
- Successor: Giulio Cesare Bergera
- Previous post: Archbishop of Durrës (1622–1632)

Orders
- Consecration: 17 September 1623 by Philibert François Milliet de Faverges

Personal details
- Born: 1578 Turin, Italy
- Died: 25 July 1640 (age 62)
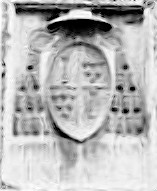
- Coat of arms

Antonio Provana (1578–1640) was a Catholic prelate who served as Archbishop of Turin (1632–1640) and Archbishop of Durrës (1622–1632).

== Biography ==
Antonio Provana was born in 1578 in Turin, Italy. On 21 July 1622, he was appointed during the papacy of Pope Gregory XV as Archbishop of Durrës. On 17 September 1623, he was consecrated bishop by Philibert François Milliet de Faverges, Archbishop of Turin, with Carlo Argentero, Bishop of Mondovi, serving as co-consecrator. On 19 January 1632, he was appointed during the papacy of Pope Urban VIII as Archbishop of Turin. He served as Archbishop of Turin until his death on 25 July 1640.

== Episcopal succession ==
While bishop, he was the principal consecrator of:

- Benoît-Théophile de Chevron Villette, Archbishop of Tarentaise (1633);
- Giusto Guérin, (Juste Guérin), Bishop of Geneva (1639);

and the principal co-consecrator of:

- Onorio de Verme, Bishop of Ravello e Scala (1624);
- Giovanni Maria Belletti, Bishop of Gerace (1625);
- Henri de Sponde, Bishop of Pamiers (1626);
- Carlo Antonio Ripa, Bishop of Mondovi (1632);
- Ippolito Franconi, Bishop of Nocera de' Pagani (1632); and
- Giovanni Battista Pontano (Montano) Bishop of Oppido Mamertina (1632).

== External links and additional sources ==
- Cheney, David M. "Archdiocese of Tiranë-Durrës". Catholic-Hierarchy.org. (for Chronology of Bishops) ^{[self-published]}
- Chow, Gabriel. "Metropolitan Archdiocese of Tiranë–Durrës (Albania)". GCatholic.org. (for Chronology of Bishops) ^{[self-published]}
- Cheney, David M. "Archdiocese of Torino {Turin}". Catholic-Hierarchy.org. (for Chronology of Bishops) ^{[self-published]}
- Chow, Gabriel. "Metropolitan Archdiocese of Torino (Italy)". GCatholic.org. (for Chronology of Bishops) ^{[self-published]}

Catholic Church titles
Preceded by	Archbishop of Durrës; 1622–1632	Succeeded by Girolamo Greco
Preceded by Giovanni Battista Ferrero	Archbishop of Turin; 1632–1640	Succeeded by Giulio Cesare Bergera
