= Cristoforo della Rovere =

Italian Roman Catholic bishop and cardinal

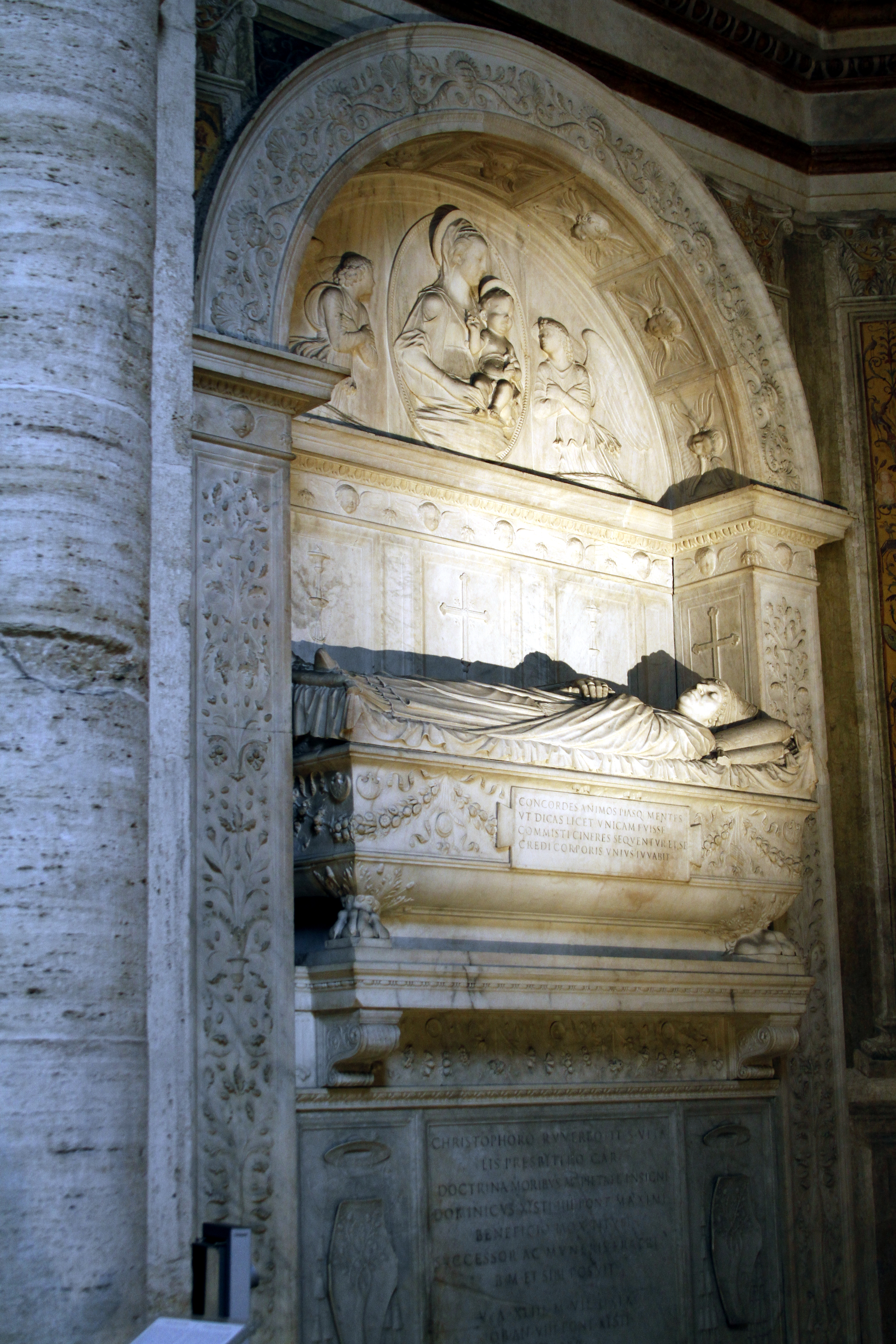
Tomb of Cristoforo and his brother Domenico in Santa Maria del Popolo, Rome

Cristoforo della Rovere (13 June 1434 – 1 February 1478) (called the Cardinal of Tarentaise) was an Italian Roman Catholic bishop and cardinal.

== Biography ==
A member of the House of della Rovere, Cristoforo della Rovere was born in Turin on 13 June 1434, the son of Giovanni della Rovere and Anna del Pozo. His younger brother, Domenico della Rovere, also became a cardinal.

He was educated at the University of Bologna, receiving a doctorate in law. He then became a jurisconsult and a protonotary apostolic.

On 3 August 1472, he was elected Archbishop of Tarentaise. Pope Sixtus IV confirmed his appointment on 15 September 1472, and he subsequently occupied the see until his death. The Pope later made him Governor of the Castel Sant'Angelo in Rome.

In the consistory of 10 December 1477, Pope Sixtus IV made him a cardinal priest. On 12 December 1477, he received the titular church of San Vitale and the Pope dispatched one of the conservators of Rome to the Castel Sant'Angelo to give him the red hat.

He was already ill when he became a cardinal and died shortly thereafter in Rome on 1 February 1478. He is buried in Santa Maria del Popolo.
