= 983 royal election =

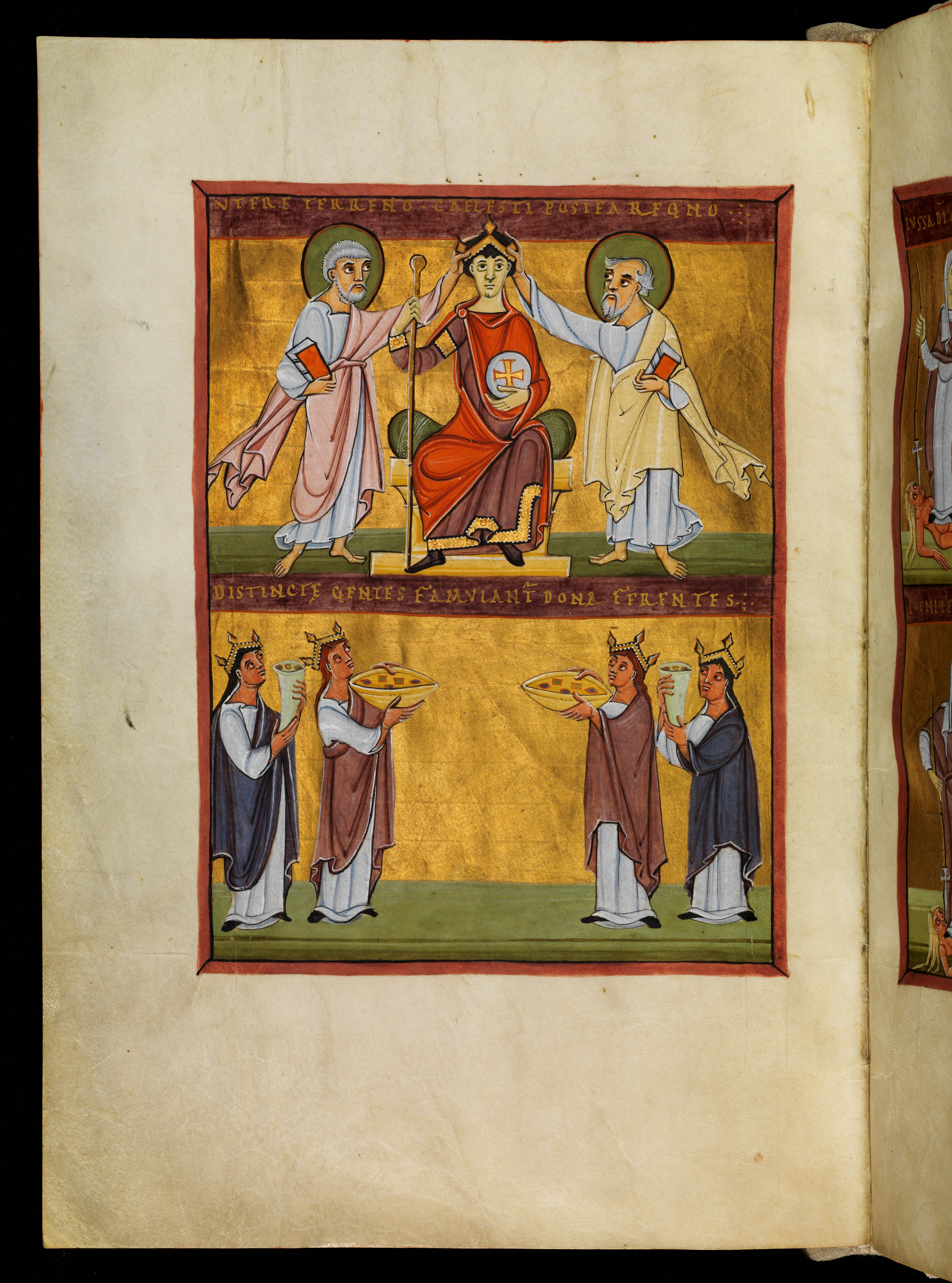
Coronation of Otto III, from the Bamberg Apocalypse

A royal election took place on 27 May 983 in Verona in the Kingdom of Italy. The three-year-old Otto III was elected to co-rule in the kingdoms of Italy and Germany with his father, the Emperor Otto II.

According to Thietmar of Merseburg, the initiative for the imperial diet that elected Otto III came from the princes: "all our princes came sorrowfully together after receiving the evil tidings [from Italy] and unanimously demanded to see [the emperor]." The "evil tidings" concerned Otto II's defeat at the battle of Crotone in July 982. Otto's itinerary between his defeat at Crotone and the diet at Verona is poorly known. It has been argued that he returned to Germany and held a preliminary diet in Mainz in February–March 983 in preparation for the major diet at Verona, but scholars do not universally accept this theory.

The diet of Verona was attended by magnates from both Germany and northern Italy. In the words of Thietmar, "the emperor's son was elected lord by all" (filius inperatoris ab omnibus in dominum eligitur). Although its main purpose was the election of Otto III as co-ruler, the diet dealt with other matters as well. The magnates promised troops for Otto II to renew the campaign in southern Italy. They also selected new dukes of Bavaria and Swabia, since Duke Otto I, who had held both duchies, had died.

Otto III became the first German king who was a minor. His election also represented the continuation of the Ottonian dynasty, established by his grandfather, Otto I. It was the only election held in Italy in the history of the Holy Roman Empire and the only one with substantial Italian participation. Germany and Italy had only been united under a single crown since 951. The events of 983 suggest that Otto II's policy was to unify the German and Italian kingdoms into a single empire. The election of Otto III assured stability during Otto II's projected long absence from Germany.

Otto II sent Otto III to Germany for his coronation, while he remained in Italy. Otto III was consecrated and crowned at Aachen on 25 December 983 by Archbishops Willigis of Mainz and John X of Ravenna in a joint German–Italian ceremony. Otto II had died in Italy on 7 December, but his death was not known in Aachen at the time of the coronation.

The election of 983 was not wholly undisputed. In 984, Otto III's uncle, Henry the Quarrelsome, attempted to usurp the kingship, but the German magnates recognized Otto. There is likewise little to indicate that Otto was widely recognized as king in Italy during his minority in Germany. Despite Otto II's death, Otto III remained only a king until his imperial coronation by Pope Gregory V in Rome in 996.

== Bibliography ==
- Althoff, Gerd (2003) [1996]. Otto III. Translated by Phyllis G. Jestice. Pennsylvania State University Press.
- Collins, Roger (1999) [1991]. Early Medieval Europe, 300–1000. Macmillan Education.
- Jestice, Phyllis G. (2003). "Translator's Note". Otto III. Pennsylvania State University Press. pp. vii–viii.
- Müller-Mertens, Eckhard (1999). "The Ottonians as Kings and Emperors". In Reuter, Timothy (ed.). The New Cambridge Medieval History. Vol. 3: c.900 – c.1024. Cambridge University Press. pp. 233–266.
- Reuter, Timothy (1991). Germany in the Early Middle Ages, c. 800–1056. London: Longman.
- Uhlirz, Mathilde (1950). "Der Fürstentag zu Mainz im Februar–März 983". Mitteilungen des Instituts für Österreichische Geschichtsforschung. 58 (JG): 267–284. doi:10.7767/miog.1950.58.jg.267. S2CID 164040296.
- Wilson, Peter (2016). Heart of Europe: A History of the Holy Roman Empire. Cambridge, MA: Belknap Press.
