= Giulio Cesare Bergera =

Italian archbishop

Most Reverend Giulio Cesare Bergera
- Archbishop of Turin
- Church: Catholic Church
- Archdiocese: Archdiocese of Turin
- In office: 1643–1660
- Predecessor: Antonio Provana
- Successor: Michele Beggiami

Orders
- Consecration: 1 March 1643 by Ciriaco Rocci

Personal details
- Born: 1595 Turin, Italy
- Died: 1660 (age 65)

Giulio Cesare Bergera or Giulio Cesare Barbera (1595–1660) was a Roman Catholic prelate who served as Archbishop of Turin (1643–1660).

== Biography ==
Giulio Cesare Bergera was born in 1595 in Turin, Italy. On 23 February 1643, he was appointed during the papacy of Pope Urban VIII as Archbishop of Turin. On 1 March 1643, he was consecrated bishop by Ciriaco Rocci, Cardinal-Priest of San Salvatore in Lauro, with Alfonso Gonzaga, Titular Archbishop of Rhodus and Lelio Falconieri, Titular Archbishop of Thebaes, serving as co-consecrators. He served as Archbishop of Turin until his death in 1660.

== Episcopal succession ==
While bishop, he was the principal consecrator of:

- Michele Beggiami (Beggiamo), Bishop of Mondovi (1656);
- Filiberto Milliet de Faverges, Bishop of Aosta (1656); and
- Filiberto Alberto Bailly, Bishop of Aosta (1659).

== External links and additional sources ==
- Cheney, David M. "Archdiocese of Torino {Turin}". Catholic-Hierarchy.org. (for Chronology of Bishops) ^{[self-published]}
- Chow, Gabriel. "Metropolitan Archdiocese of Torino (Italy)". GCatholic.org. (for Chronology of Bishops) ^{[self-published]}

Catholic Church titles
Preceded by Antonio Provana	Archbishop of Turin; 1643–1660	Succeeded by Michele Beggiami
