= Anselm of Besate =

11th-century rhetorician

Anselm of Besate (Anselmus Peripateticus, "Anselm the Peripatetic") was an 11th-century churchman and rhetorician.

Anselm was born at Besate shortly after the year 1000 to a notable local family. He describes his genealogy in detail. He was related on his father's side to Bishops Sigifred of Piacenza, John II of Lucca and Cunibert of Turin, and to Archbishop John X of Ravenna. His mother belonged to the House of Arsago, through which he was related to Archbishop Arnulf II of Milan and Bishop Landulf II of Brescia.

Anselm received his education in Padua and Reggio, and became attached to the church of Milan. He later served in the chapel of the Emperor Henry III (reigned 1046–1056). Around 1047, he composed the Rhetorimachia (or De materia artis) and dedicated it to Henry III. It is one of the first works on rhetoric to appear in western Europe after Rabanus Maurus' De institutione clericorum of 819. It is a treatise in three books, ostensibly a letter to his nephew Rutiland to correct his confusion about rhetoric. The main targets of Anselm's rhetoric are magic and clerical vice, but he also attacks logic. To some scholars it represents a continuation of the Ciceronian tradition, or its rediscovery in 11th-century Italy, but to others it is "unlike anything that went before" (Peter Dronke) and represents the birth of a new medieval "art of controversy". It has received two critical editions.

== Editions ==
- Anselm der Peripatetiker nebst anderen Beitragen zur Literaturgeschichte Italiens im eilften Jahrhundert, ed. Ernest Dümmler. Halle: Verlag der Buchhandlung des Waisenhauses, 1872. [Edition of Rhetorimachia]
- Gunzo: Epistola ad Augienses und Anselm von Besate: Rhetorimachia, ed. Karl Manitius. Monumenta Germaniae Historica [MGH], Quellen zur Geistesgeschichte des Mittelalters [QG], vol. 2. Weimar: Hermann Böhlaus Nachfolger, 1958. [Edition of Rhetorimachia]

== Sources ==
- Bennett, Beth S. (1987). "The Significance of the Rhetorimachia of Anselm de Besate to the History of Rhetoric". Rhetorica: A Journal of the History of Rhetoric. 5 (3): 231–50. doi:10.1525/rh.1987.5.3.231.
- Bennett, Beth S. (2004). "The Controversia of Anselm de Besate". Advances in the History of Rhetoric. 7 (1): 1–15. doi:10.1080/15362426.2004.10557222.
- Cowdrey, H. E. J. (1972). "Anselm of Besate and Some North-Italian Scholars of the Eleventh Century". Journal of Ecclesiastical History. 23: 115–24. doi:10.1017/s0022046900055780.
- McDonough, Christopher J. (2010). "Anselm of Besate (Anselmus Peripateticus)". In Robert E. Bjork (ed.). The Oxford Dictionary of the Middle Ages. Oxford University Press.
- Murphy, James Jerome (1981). Rhetoric in the Middle Ages: A History of Rhetorical Theory from Saint Augustine to the Renaissance. University of California Press.
- Resnick, Irven M. (1996). "Anselm of Besate and Humanism in the Eleventh Century". The Journal of Medieval Latin. 6: 5–11.
- Southern, R. W. (1953). The Making of the Middle Ages. New Haven: Yale University Press.
