= Nicolas Guibert =

Franco-German physician and critic of alchemy

Nicolas Guibert (c. 1547 – c. 1620) was a Franco-German physician and alchemist who later became a fierce critic of alchemy, opposing ideas on transmutation in his major work Alchymia ratione et experientia ita demum viriliter impugnata (1603) which prompted a debate. He has been called the "Copernicus of chemistry".

Guibert was born in St. Nicolas-de-Port, Lorraine, in a Catholic family. He studied medicine at Perugia and travelled around Europe working briefly at various times in the service of Francesco de’ Medici, Cardinal Granvelle, and Giambattista della Porta. He then practiced medicine at Casteldurante and became a chief physician from 1578 in a papal state. He became alchemist to Otto Truchsess in Augsburg the next year. He however began to find problems in alchemy and motivated by Thomas Erastus, he published Alchymia ratione et experientia ita demum viriliter impugnata et expugnata in 1603. He began the book with the note that alchemy was neither art nor science but deceit (calliditas). He noted that the claim to antiquity did not make for evidence of truth. He started pointing out that many of the foundational works were dubious or fraudulent in their claims of authorship. Some works, he accepted, were by the authors claimed, including those of Arnald of Villanova, Roger Bacon, Agrippa, and Paracelsus and these declared as being heretic on the basis of the Bible. He noted that metals could not be converted from one to the other and declared that the analogy of the conversion of a larva to a butterfly did not hold. Andreas Libavius responded to his critique with Defensio alchymiae transmutatoriae opposita Nicolai Guiberti (1604) defending the changes in plants and animals as a valid analogy. Guibert responded to some of the criticism in De interitu alchymiae (1614).
