= Gozzelino =

Saint Gozzelino (Goslino, Goscelinus, Gozzelinus) (died February 12, 1053) was an abbot of San Solutore near Turin. His feast day is February 12. His family was of the nobility. He became a monk at San Solutore in 1006. He subsequently became abbot.
