= Rita Guibert =

American author, journalist, editor, researcher and translator

- Born: December 5, 1916; Buenos Aires, Argentina
- Died: December 5, 2007 (aged 91); New York City, USA
- Education: Universidad de Buenos Aires (B.S.)
- Occupations: American author, journalist, editor, researcher and translator
- Spouses: Raúl Guibert (m.1 941-1962); Herbert Herzberg (m. 1990-2004)
- Children: Lidia Beatriz
- Writing career
- Language: English, Spanish
- Years active: 1957-2007
- Notable work: Seven Voices Seven Latin American Writers Talk to Rita Guibert

Rita Guibert (December 5, 1916 in Buenos Aires, Argentina – December 5, 2007 in New York, US) was an American author, journalist (print, television, radio), editor, researcher and translator.

== Career ==
Rita Guibert is best known as the author of the critically acclaimed Seven Voices Seven Latin American Writers Talk to Rita Guibert. The Seven Voices are in-depth tape recorded interviews of Pablo Neruda, Jorge Luis Borges, Miguel Angel Asturias, Octavio Paz, Julio Cortázar, Gabriel García Márquez and Guillermo Cabrera Infante. The Nobel Prize in Literature was awarded to Pablo Neruda in 1971, Miguel Angel Asturias in 1967, Octavio Paz in 1990 and Gabriel García Márquez in 1982. Specific interviews of Gabriel García Márquez and Jorge Luis Borges conducted by Rita Guibert including text that was not included in Seven Voices Seven Latin American Writers Talk to Rita Guibert were also reprinted.

Guibert was a reporter at LIFE en Español, collaborated at the Latin American Desk of Associated Press and was a member of the board of contributors at Nuestro. Her articles have appeared in the Paris Review, Intellectual Digest, Review 72, Vista Magazine and Revista Iberoamerica. At ANACITEC, she was the Representative to the NGO-UN, Vice President for Cultural Affairs and Editor of their newsletter.

Her personal interviews took her from the United States to Chile, England, France and Spain. She interviewed Pablo Neruda in Isla Negra, Chile, Jorge Luis Borges in Cambridge, Massachusetts, Miguel Angel Asturias in Paris, Octavio Paz in Churchill College, Cambridge, Julio Cortázar in Paris, Gabriel García Márquez in Barcelona and New York City, and Guillermo Cabrera Infante in London. She accompanied Pablo Neruda to Stockholm when he was awarded the Nobel Prize for Literature in 1971. After a few days in Stockholm, she traveled with Pablo Neruda and his wife to Warsaw to attend the Polish premiere of his play Splendor and Death of Joaquín Murieta.

She translated multiple children's books into Spanish for Random House Farrar Straus and Giroux, E.P. Dutton and Dial Press, short stories and educational material for Scholastic, as well as art catalogs for Chase Manhattan Bank Program. The Museum of Modern Art, and American Museum of Folk Art. She was editor of Estancias, Las Grandes Haciendas de Argentina. The book was published simultaneously in three editions: English, French and Spanish.

In 2015 Random House published Seven Voices; Seven Latin American Writers Talk to Rita Guibert as an e-book in English and Spanish.

== Archives ==
The Princeton University Library's Rare Books and Special Collections Collection announced the establishment of the Rita Guibert Collection of Latin American Authors in June 2015. The collection includes audiocassette tapes containing her in-depth interviews with Latin American authors, including Pablo Neruda, Jorge Luis Borges, Gabriel García Márquez, Octavio Paz, Julio Cortázar, Miguel Ángel Asturias, Guillermo Cabrera Infante, Manuel Puig, Carlos Fuentes and José Donoso as well as correspondence, interview and article drafts, galleys, proofs, and photographs associated with the author's work.
