= Landulf (bishop of Turin) =

Italian bishop

Landulf of Turin (died 1037) was an Italian bishop. He was bishop of Turin from 1011 until his death in 1037.

== Life ==
According to Peter Damian, Landulf was an imperial chaplain, before Henry II appointed him bishop of Turin. One of Landulf's first acts as bishop of Turin was to confirm, and increase, the donations of his predecessor, Bishop Gezo of Turin, to the episcopal monastery of San Solutore in Turin. In January 1015, Landulf was in Rome, where he witnessed Pope Benedict VIII’s confirmation of the Abbey of Fruttuaria’s ‘apostolic liberty’. In 1017 Landulf made a donation to the episcopal convent of San Pietro in Turin. In 1022, Landulf was present at the synod of Pavia, presided over by Benedict VIII and Henry II. Around 1028 Landulf worked with Ulric Manfred II of Turin, Bishop Alric of Asti, and Archbishop Aribert of Milan to combat heresy at Monforte. Because the diocese of Turin had been devastated "not only by pagans, but also by perfidious Christians" (non solum a paganis verum etiam a perfidis christianis), Landulf pursued a policy of reconstruction during his episcopate. He restored the cathedral church of Turin, and built new churches and fortifications in Chieri, Testona, Rivalba, Piobesi, Piasco, Mathi, Mocoriadum and Tizanum. He also founded the monastery of Santa Maria in Cavour, which he endowed with property around Pinerolo.

== Notes ==
Catholic Church titles
Preceded by Gezo of Turin	Bishop of Turin; 1011–1037	Succeeded by Guido of Turin
