= Cunibert (bishop of Turin) =

Italian bishop

Cunibert of Turin (died c.1082) was an Italian bishop. According to Anselm of Besate, Cunibert was a member of the Besate dynasty from Milan. Cunibert is first documented as bishop of Turin at the Council of Pavia (October 1046). His episcopate lasted from then until his death, c.1082.

== Cunibert and Gregorian Reform ==
Cunibert had an ambiguous relationship with Gregorian reform. In April 1059, Cunibert attended the Lateran council held by Pope Nicholas II in Rome. During the Cadalan Schism (1061-1064) he supported the Pope Alexander II against Bishop Cadalus of Parma. He also supported the canons of San Lorenzo at Oulx.

Yet Cunibert could not always be relied upon in matters of reform. Peter Damian accused Cunibert of being too lax in his dealings with simonists and unchaste priests. Damian wrote to Adelaide of Susa to see if she could encourage Cunibert to take action against them.

== Cunibert and the Abbey of San Michele della Chiusa ==
Cunibert was opposed to the appointment of Benedict II as abbot of San Michele della Chiusa, believing that the abbey belonged to the diocese of Turin, and that he, rather than the monks of San Michele should choose the new abbot. In 1078, along with Peter I, Count of Savoy, Cunibert thus attempted to drive Abbot Benedict II from the abbey. Cunibert also accompanied Henry IV of Germany to Piacenza (1077), and on his new Italian expedition (1081).

== Sources ==
- Anselm of Besate, Rhetorimachia, in Gunzo: Epistola ad Augienses und Anselm von Besate: Rhetorimachia, ed. K. Manitius, MGH QQ zur Geistesgesch. 2 (Weimar, 1958), accessible online at: Monumenta Germaniae Historica
- C.W. Previté-Orton, The Early History of the House of Savoy (1000-1233) (Cambridge, 1912), accessible online at: archive.org
- S. Hellmann, Die Grafen von Savoyen und das Reich: bis zum Ende der staufischen Periode (Innsbruck, 1900), accessible online (but without page numbers) at: Genealogie Mittelalter
- Fedele Savio (1898). Gli antichi Vescovi d'Italia: il Piemonte (in Italian). Torino: Bocca. pp. 347–350.
- G. Sergi, L'aristocrazia della preghiera: politica e scelte religiose nel medioevo italiano (1994), esp. pp. 181–185.

Catholic Church titles
Preceded by Guido of Turin	Bishop of Turin; 1046–1082	Succeeded by Vitelmo of Turin
