= Victor of Turin =

5th-century bishop and saint

Victor of Turin succeeded Maximus as bishop of Turin in 465 AD. He is venerated as a saint.
