= Baccio Pontelli =

Italian architect

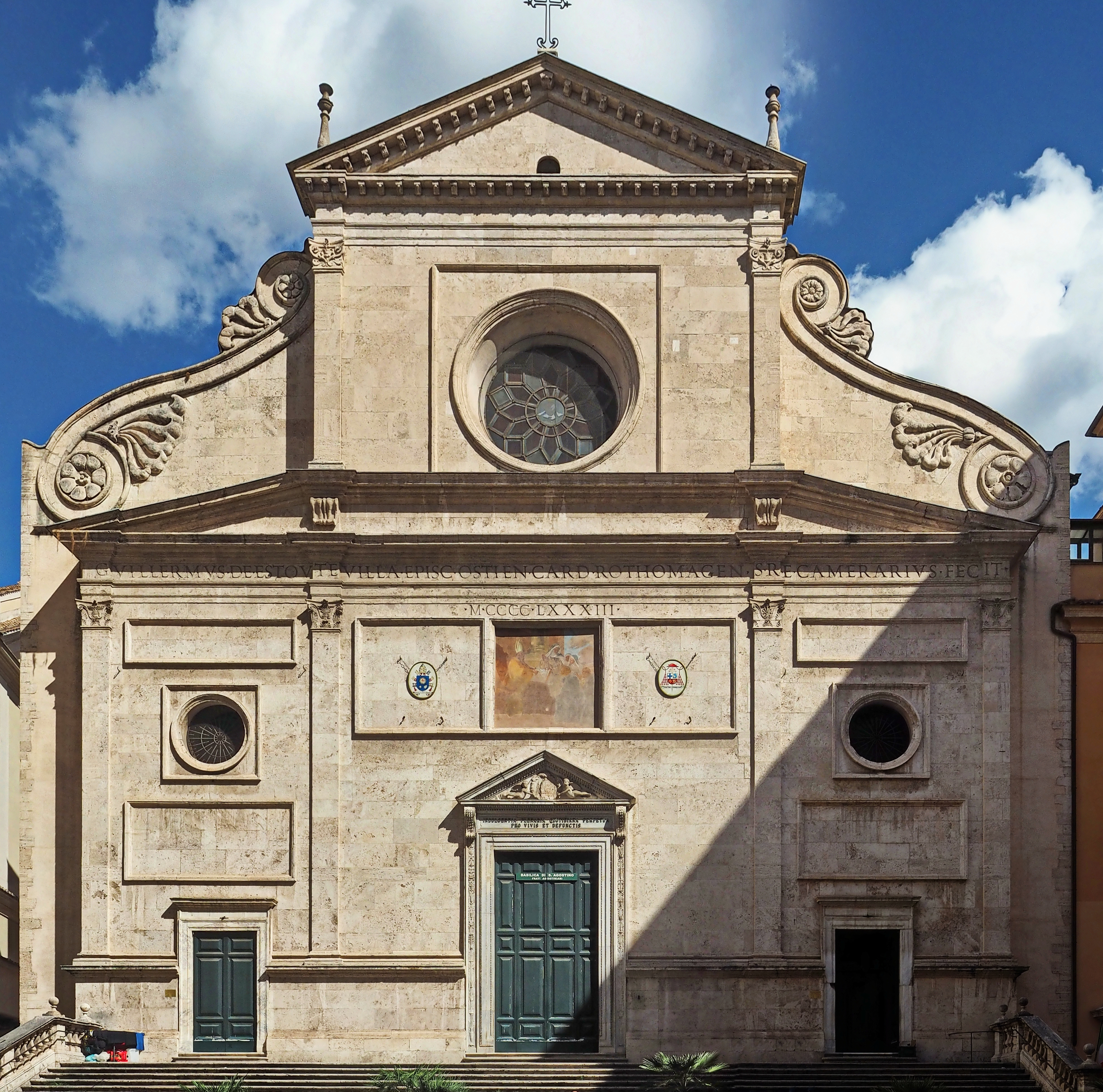
Sant'Agostino, Rome, 1483, possibly to a design by Leon Battista Alberti

Baccio Pontelli (c. 1449 – c. 1494) was an Italian architect and worker in wood inlays, who designed the Sistine Chapel in Vatican City. Baccio is an abbreviation of Bartolomeo.

Pontelli was born in Florence; in 1459 his father declared he was ten years old. He trained in artistic woodwork such as marquetry in the workshop of Giuliano and Benedetto da Maiano in Florence, and was influenced by Francesco di Giorgio Martini during a trip to Urbino (1480–1482), where he worked on the Studiolo of Duke Federico de Montefeltro, in the Palazzo Ducale, Urbino. He worked in Florence and later in Urbino on inlays.

Acting as an architect in Rome, he participated in the pope Sixtus IV's urban renewal. His exact contributions are unclear; he was perhaps given more work supervising construction than designing. The tendency of Giorgio Vasari to attribute most Papal building commissions in the period to his fellow-Florentine has rather confused matters. That said, his projects included: Santa Aurea and fortifications in Ostia; the Ponte Sisto in Rome; the hospital of Santo Spirito in Sassia; the church Sant'Agostino; the facade of Santa Maria del Popolo; San Pietro in Vincoli; Santi Apostoli and design for the Sistine Chapel.

In the last years of his life he worked in the Marche region on the military fortresses of Acquaviva Picena Jesi, Osimo and Senigallia. In 1494 he is recorded working at various places in the Kingdom of Naples. He died at Urbino and is buried in the church of St Dominic it there, where a nephew placed an epitaph in 1577.

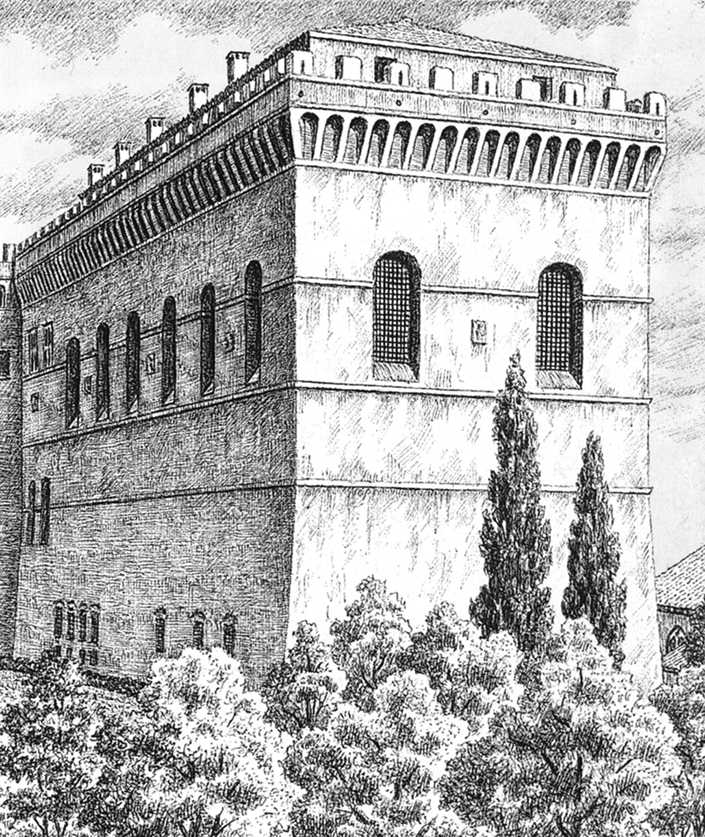
The Sistine Chapel as it may have appeared in the 15th century (19th-century drawing)
