= San Pellegrino in Vaticano =

Church in Vatican City

Church of Saint Peregrinus in the Vatican
- San Pellegrino in Vaticano; San Pellegrino in Naumachia
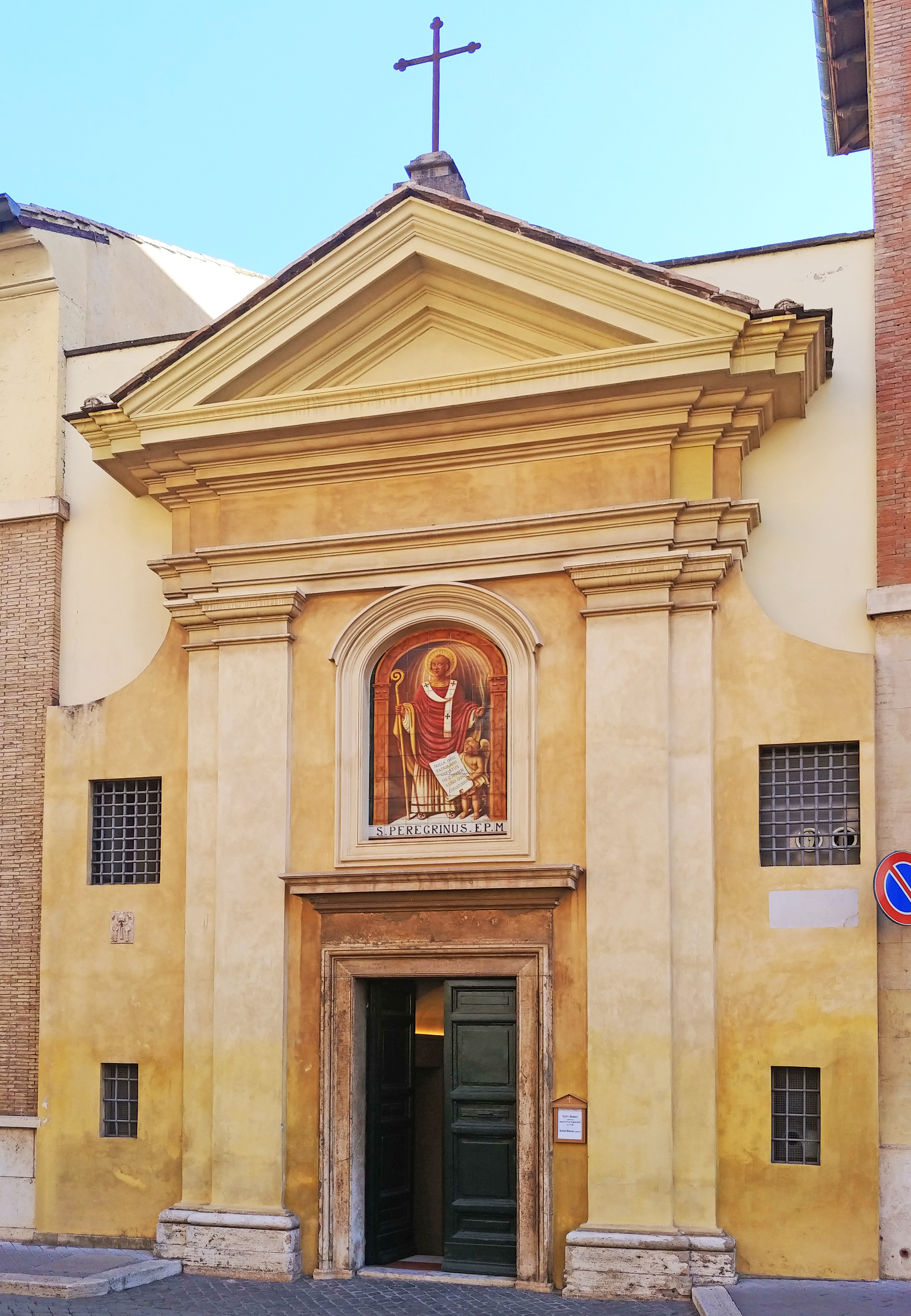
- Façade
- Click on the map for a fullscreen view
- 41°54′18.01″N 012°27′25.06″E
- Location: Vatican City
- Country: Vatican City
- Denomination: Roman Catholic

History
- Status: Oratory, national church

Architecture
- Architectural type: Church
- Style: Baroque
- Groundbreaking: 8th century
- Completed: 16th century

Specifications
- Length: 20 metres (66 ft)
- Width: 9 metres (30 ft)

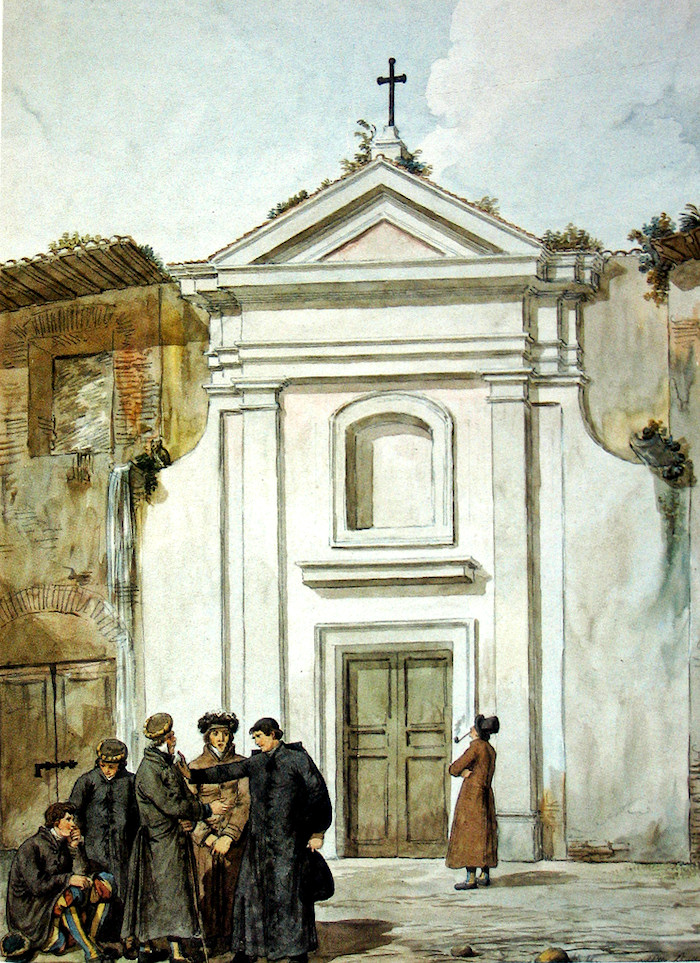
An 1834 watercolor of the façade of the church painted by Achille Pinelli

The Church of San Pellegrino in Vaticano (English: Saint Peregrine in the Vatican) is an ancient Roman Catholic oratory in the Vatican City, located on the Via dei Pellegrini. The church is dedicated to Saint Peregrine of Auxerre, a Roman priest appointed by Pope Sixtus II who had suffered martyrdom in Gaul in the third century. It is one of the oldest churches in the Vatican City.

The church built by Pope Leo III (750 AD - 816 AD) around 800 first received the name of "San Pellegrino in Naumachia", making reference to the naumachia built northwest of the Castel Sant'Angelo and dedicated by Roman emperor Trajan in 109. In the seventeenth century, Pope Clement X granted the church to the Pontifical Swiss Guards, who used it for their religious services in combination with the church of Santi Martino e Sebastiano degli Svizzeri until 1977. Under the name of San Pellegrino degli Svizzeri (English: Saint Peregrine of the Swiss), it became the national church in Rome of Switzerland. The oratory later fell into disrepair but was restored in the 19th century when evidence of the 9th-century frescoes were discovered.

The church now serves as the chapel of the Pontifical Gendarmerie and the firefighters of the Vatican City and is entrusted to the care of the chaplain of the corps —currently Msgr. Giulio Viviani.

== History ==
The origins of the church are ancient, dating back to the eighth century. This is attested to by several passages in the Liber Pontificalis, as well as archaeological excavations made by Msgr Anton de Waal in 1888. De Waal brought to light ancient paintings dating from the 9th century, and others from the 13th-14th century There is a tradition that Charlemagne, on the occasion of his coronation in 800, gave the relics of Peregrine of Auxerre to this church, whence its name. Another reason may have been the church's service to pilgrims (Latin: peregrini), since annexed to the church were the Hospitale Francorum, a hospital for French pilgrims, and a cemetery.

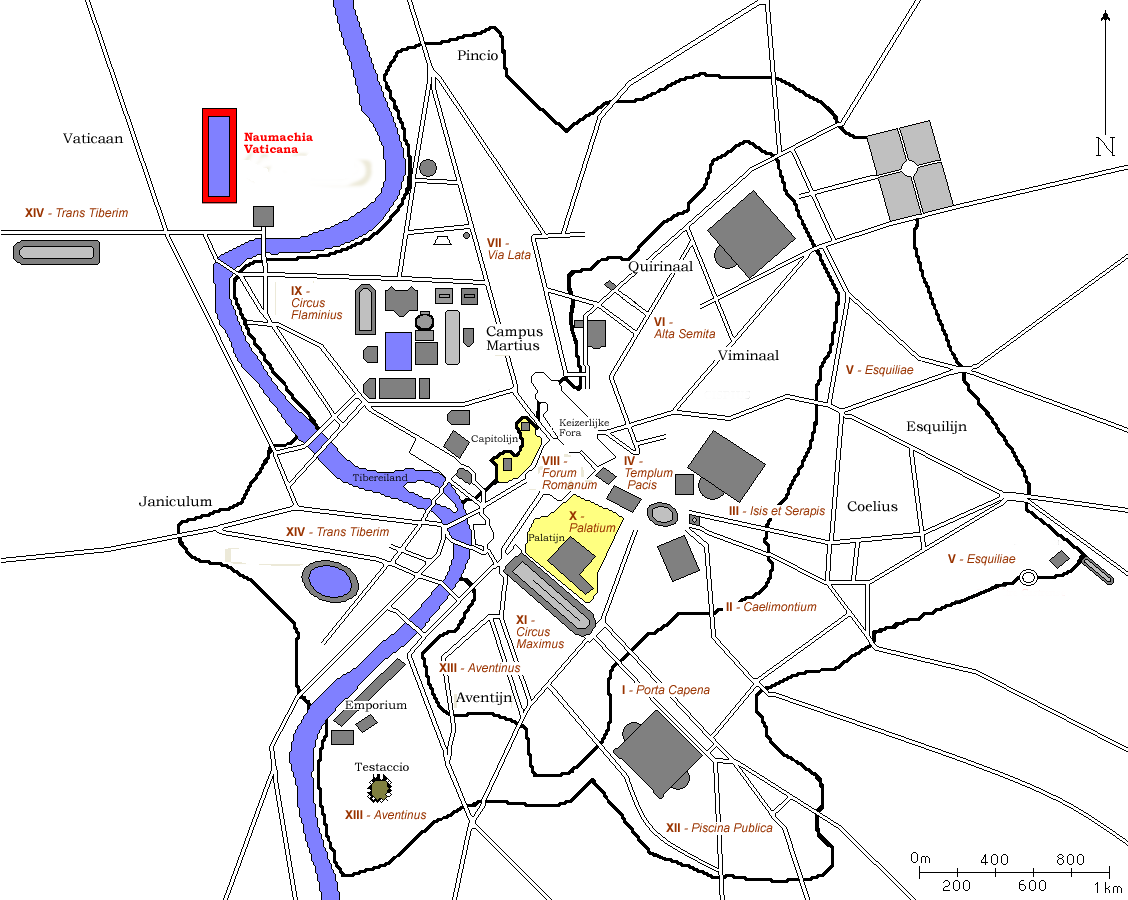
Naumachia Vaticana on a map of ancient Rome around 300 AD

The church was originally called San Pellegrino in Naumachia. A naumachia, literally "naval combat", is an artificial lake where naval battles were reenacted for an audience. The 5th century "The Passion of Peter and Paul", recounts the crucifixion of St Peter and adds: "Holy men … took down his body secretly and put it under the terebinth tree near the Naumachia, in the place which is called the Vatican". The ruins of a structure were excavated in 1743, between via Alberico et via Cola di Rienzo. Hülsen suggested that this structure, built close to the Circus of Nero and lying north-west of the later Mausoleum of Hadrian (today's Castel Sant'Angelo), was the naumachia the name of the church was referring to and gave it the name of "Naumachia Vaticana". Subsequent excavations have helped to identify its shape, size and orientation. It was a rectangular structure with round internal and external corners, 120 metres (390 ft) wide and, estimating from the excavations, at least 300 metres (980 ft) long, oriented north–south. Esther Boise van Deman identified the style of the brickwork facing the naumachia as trajanic. In 1932 Jérôme Carcopino reported the discovery among Fasti Ostienses of the dedication by Emperor Trajan on 11 November 109 of a naumachia. The "Naumachia Traiani" has been identified the Naumachia Vaticana.

Pope Paschal I (d. 824) granted the church to the monastery of Santa Cecilia in Trastevere, and Pope Leo IX (1002–1054) passed it on to the monastery of Santo Stefano degli Abissini. A document in the archives of Santa Maria in Via Lata dating from 1030 records that the church was located on land "outside the gate of Blessed Peter the Apostle, not far away from the Leonine Wall of the city". From the thirteenth century onwards, the church belonged to the canons of St. Peter's, who restored it in 1590.

As a consequence of the 1648 Peace of Westphalia, the Pontifical Swiss Guard lost the right to burial in the Teutonic and Flemish Cemetery in the Vatican (Italian: Campo Santo dei Teutonici e dei Fiamminghi) that became reserved exclusively for German nationals. They also lost the use of their little chapel in the Church of Santa Maria della Pietà in Camposanto dei Teutonici. In 1653, Johann Rudolf Pfyffer von Altishofen, commander of the Swiss Guard, obtained from Pope Innocent X the right to use the church of San Pellegrino with the adjoining cemetery. Von Pfyffer von Altishofen is buried in the church.

In 1671, Pope Clement X gave it to the Swiss Guard, who used it for their religious services until 1977 in combination with the church of Santi Martino e Sebastiano degli Svizzeri. It was considered as the national church in Rome of Switzerland. The cemetery of the Swiss is behind the church. For centuries members of the Swiss Guard were buried in the crypt of the church. The oratory later fell into disrepair but was restored in the 19th century, when evidence of frescoes of the 9th century were found, as well as of others of the 13th and 14th centuries which include a depiction of Christ Pantocrator.

It was made the chapel of the Gendarmerie and the firefighters of Vatican City in 1977.

== Architecture ==
The oldest parts of today's building date from the 15th century. The church received many new elements of decoration in the 12th and 18th century. Between the 13th and 15th centuries, several Popes such as Innocent III, Gregory IX, Boniface IX and Nicholas V, had a special interest in the church of San Pellegrino.

=== Exterior ===
The Pontifical Swiss Guard commissioned in 1671 the church's façade in neoclassical style. It is a simple façade with a pair of doubled Doric columns that supports a large entablature crowned by a triangular pediment. The large round-headed niche above the entrance is decorated with a representation of St. Peregrinus.

=== Interior ===
The tombs of past captains of the Swiss Guard are located in the church as well.

==== Frescoes ====
Inside are the remains of some ancient frescoes, including a fresco of Christ Pantocrator. In the original building, only the apse was decorated with frescoes.

==== Wooden ceiling ====
The ceiling of the church is decorated with a wooden coffer, popular during the Renaissance and Baroque periods, and likely dates back to the 17th century. Among its blue, green and yellow gold coffers, the coats of arms of Swiss Guard commanders like the lilies of the family Pfyffer von Altishofen and the flower the Röist family were inserted.

== See also ==
- Index of Vatican City-related articles
