= Naumachia Vaticana =

Ancient structure in Rome, dedicated AD 109

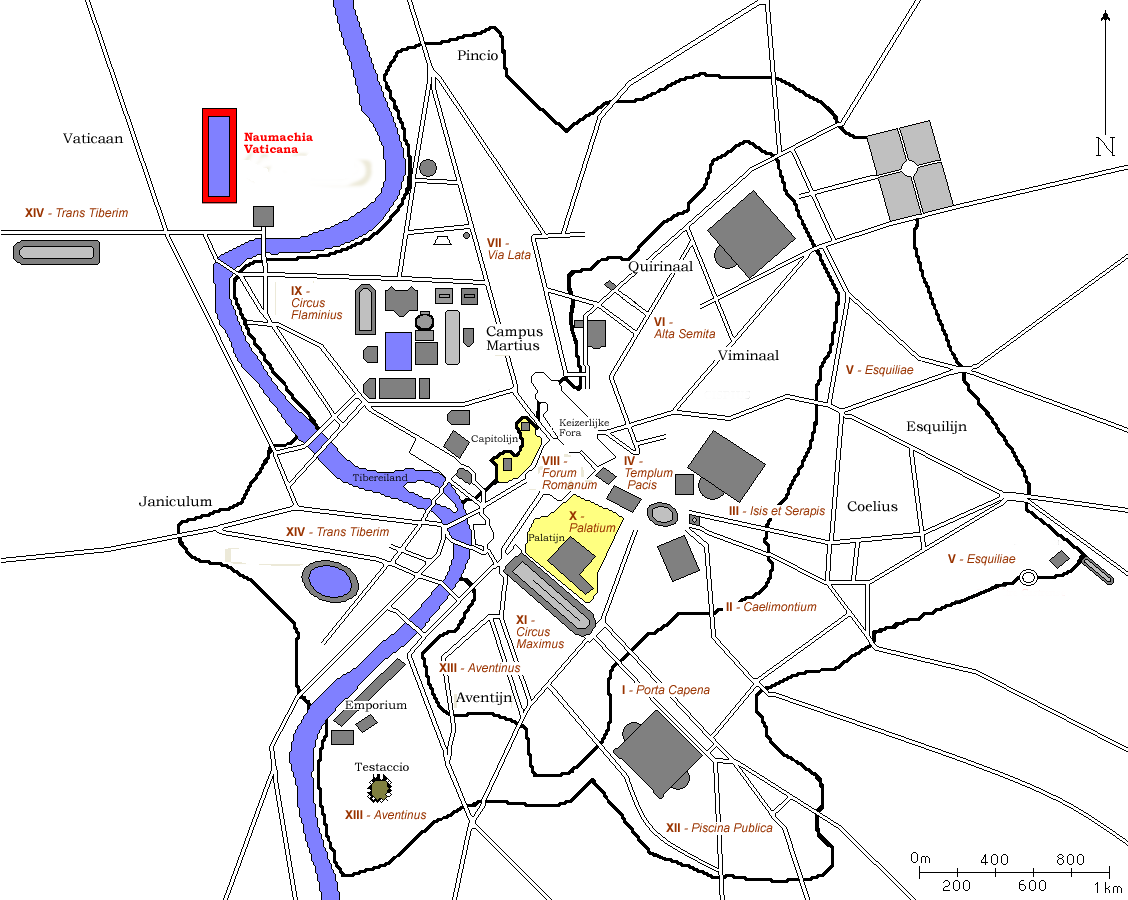
Naumachia Vaticana on a map of ancient Rome around 300 AD

The Naumachia Vaticana or Trajan's Naumachia (Latin: Naumachia Traiani), also referred to inaccurately as the Circus of Hadrian, was an ancient structure in Rome, Italy, dedicated by Roman emperor Trajan in AD 109. A naumachia, it functioned as a large stadium that could be filled with water to reenact naval battles for an audience. The building was located south of the Vatican Hill, northwest of the Mausoleum of Hadrian, and near the Gaianum.

A 5th-century text that recounts the crucifixion of St Peter saying: "Holy men... took down his body secretly and put it under the terebinth tree near the Naumachia, in the place which is called the Vatican" The ruins of a structure were excavated in 1743, between the streets via Alberico and via Cola di Rienzo. Christian Hülsen, a historian involved in the project, suggested that this structure, built close to the Circus of Nero and lying north-west of the later Mausoleum of Hadrian, was the naumachia the text was referring to and gave it the current name "Naumachia Vaticana".

Subsequent excavations have helped to identify its shape, size and orientation. It was a rectangular structure with round internal and external corners, 120 metres (390 ft) wide and, estimating from the excavations, at least 300 metres (980 ft) long, oriented north–south. Esther Boise van Deman identified the style of the brickwork facing the naumachia as Trajanic. The archaeological work reveals it had substantial bleachers (tiered stands for spectators) and the surface was about one sixth the size of the earlier Augustan naumachia. Two parts of the foundations of the stands, with vaulted corridors and remnants of four rows of seats, have also been found preserved. Other remains show that the walls were covered with a water-resistant mortar and the area was fitted with drainage pipes.

The current Church of San Pellegrino in Vaticano was once called San Pellegrino in Naumachia due to its vicinity to this stadium. A possible explanation for some sources erroneously calling it the Circus of Hadrian could be due to the similarities of its shape to that of other excavated ancient circuses, along with the site's proximity to the Mausoleum dedicated to the same emperor. In the absence of any other texts or further mention of this naumachia, it is assumed that it was mainly used at the time of Trajan's rule. In 1932, Jérôme Carcopino reported the discovery among Fasti Ostienses of the dedication by Emperor Trajan on 11 November 109 of a naumachia.

== Sources ==
- Ball Platner, Samuel (1929), "Naumachia Vaticana", A Topographical Dictionary of Ancient Rome, London: Oxford University Press.
- Barnes, Arthur (1900), St. Peter in Rome and His Tomb on the Vatican Hill, London: Swan Sonnenschein
- Boise van Deman, Esther (1912), "Methods of Determining the Date of Roman Concrete Monuments (second paper)", American Journal of Archaeology, 16 (3), Archaeological Institute of America: 387–432, doi:10.2307/497195, JSTOR 497195, S2CID 245264922
- Carcopino, Jérôme (1932), "Note sur un Nouveau Fragment des Fastes d'Ostie" (PDF), Comptes rendus des séances de l'Académie des Inscriptions et Belles-Lettres (in French) (4), Ministère de la jeunesse, de l’éducation nationale et de la recherche, Direction de l’enseignement supérieur, Sous-direction des bibliothèques et de la documentation: 363–381, archived from the original (PDF) on 2015-09-24
- Jordan, Henri; Hülsen, Christian (1907), "Die Insel. Die Stadttheile am Rechten Tiberufer", Topographie der stadt Rom im alterthum (in German), Berlin: Weidmannsche Buchhandlung, pp. 622–669
