= Spectacles in ancient Rome =

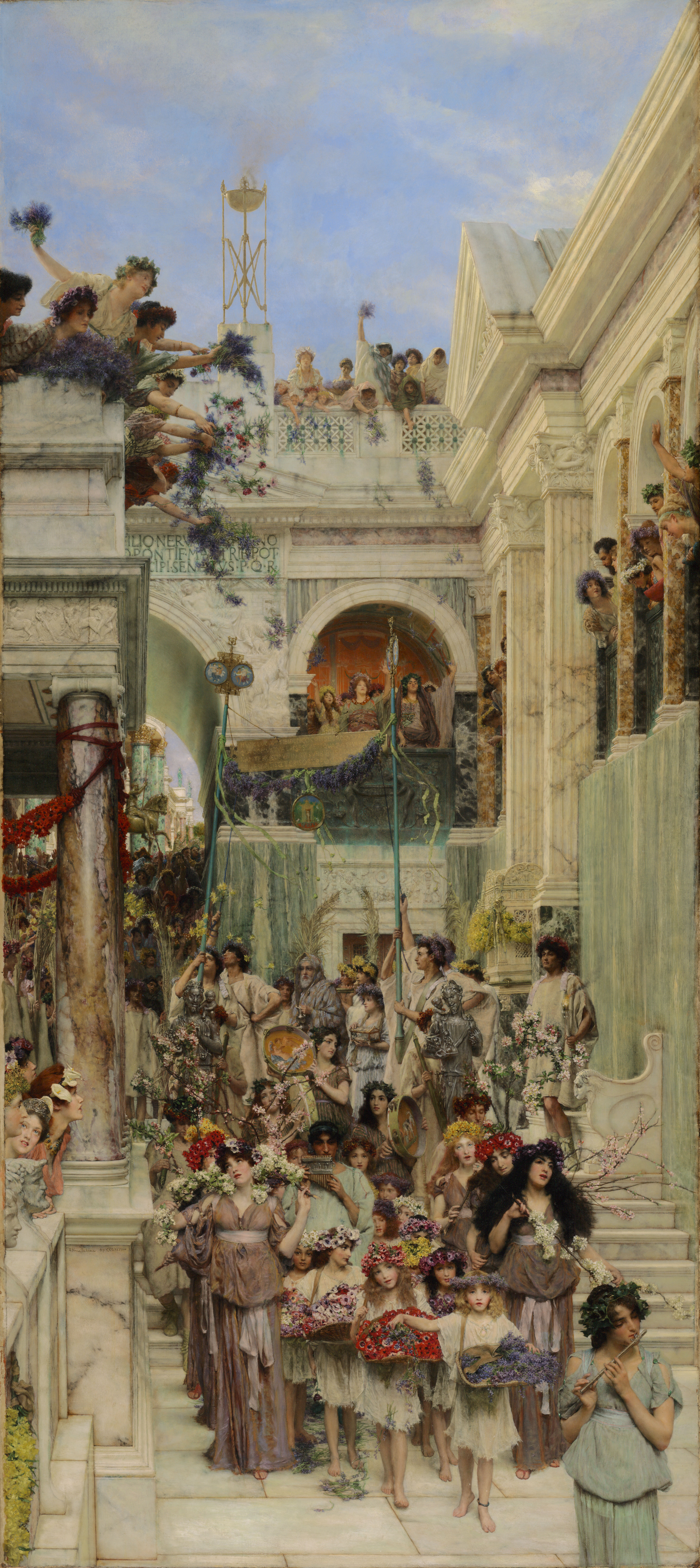
The Cerealia were celebrated in ancient Rome with a ceremony and then with the ludi cerealici in the Circus Maximus (painting by Lawrence Alma-Tadema, 1894).

The spectacles in ancient Rome were numerous, open to all citizens and generally free of charge; some of them were distinguished by the grandeur of the stagings and cruelty.

Romans preferred to attend gladiatorial fights, those with ferocious beasts (venationes), reproductions of naval battles (naumachia), chariot races, athletic contests, theatrical performances by mimes, and pantomimes.

Forty years after the invective of Juvenal (n. between 55 and 60-m. after 127), who lamented the republican sobriety and severity of a people who now aspired only to panem et circenses, bread and spectacles, Fronto (100–166), in almost the same words, described disconsolately the sad reality:

Populum romanum duabus praecipue rebus, annona et spectacula, teneri.
The Roman people are concerned primarily with two things, food and spectacles.

Indeed, the Roman ruling class considered it its primary task to distribute food once a month to the people and to distract them and regulate their leisure time with the free entertainment offered on religious holidays or secular occasions.

== Feasts in the Roman calendar ==
Numerous were the occasions for Romans to attend spectacles during Roman festivals on the occasion of religious celebrations. From a rough calculation "[...] neglecting certain duplications whereby two festivals coincided [on the same day]...we arrive at this mathematical calculation: the obligatory feast days of imperial Rome occupied more than half the year...."

But in addition to those offered in Rome by the Caesars there were also those that were celebrated in the countryside in peasant hamlets, neighborhood festivals in honor of local shrines, those of the new cults, those of the guilds (scholae), those of the military, and finally those that surprisingly offered imperial munificence such as gladiatorial fights that in the second century CE could last for months at a time. Thus "it can be said that [...] there was no Roman year that did not bear two feast days to a working day." and that the spectacles were thus almost daily. Suetonius records that since confusion and disorder reigned in the spectacles, the Roman emperor, Augustus, introduced order and discipline, (Note: In Augustus 44, Suetonius relates that Augustus put the entertainment business in order after learning that a senator, at some games in Pozzuoli, was not received by anyone, to the princeps' severe indignation.) as well as:

Spectaculorum et assiduitate et varietate et magnificentia omnes antecessit. Fecisse se ludos ait suo nomine quater, pro aliis magistratibus, qui aut abessent aut non sufficerent, ter et vicies. Fecitque nonnumquam etiam vicatim ac pluribus scaenis per omnium linguarum histriones, munera non in Foro modo, nec in amphitheatro, sed et in Circo et in Saeptis, et aliquando nihil praeter venationem edidit; athletas quoque exstructis in campo Martio sedilibus ligneis; item navale proelium circa Tiberim cavato solo, in quo nunc Caesarum nemus est. Quibus diebus custodes in urbe disposuit, ne raritate remanentium grassatoribus obnoxia esset.
In number, variety and magnificence of spectacles he surpassed all [his predecessors]. [Augustus] himself says that in his own name he celebrated public games four times and twenty-three times for other magistrates who were absent or had insufficient means. And he also celebrated in different districts, with numerous scenes, using actors speaking all languages; he held spectacles not only in the forum and the amphitheater, but also in the circus and the Saepta, and sometimes it was just hunting parties (venationes); he also organized fights between athletes in the Campus Martius, building wooden benches; and a naval battle, for which he had the ground dug near the Tiber (Naumachia Augusti), where the Caesars' forest is now. During those days he placed overseers to guard the city [of Rome], so that it would not be exposed to the danger of brigands, considering the small number of those who remained there.

— Suetonius, Augustus, 43.

Augustus had also made it a habit, in the days leading up to the spectacles, in case some animal never before seen and worthy of being known had been brought to Rome, to present it to the people in an extraordinary way, in any place: for example, a rhinoceros at the Saepta Julia, a tiger in a theatrical scene, a snake of fifty cubits (about 22 meters) in front of the Tribal Assembly.

Again Augustus had the Senate decree that, for the duration of public spectacles, wherever they were offered, the first row of benches belonged to the senators, and he forbade Rome to allow ambassadors from allied or free nations to take their seats in the orchestra, because he had been embarrassed [to learn] that there were freed slaves in some delegations. He separated the soldiers from the people; he assigned to the married plebeians their own bleachers; to those who wore the praetexta a particular sector of the bleachers and the one beside their preceptors; he forbade those who were poorly dressed to stand in the middle bleachers. He did not allow women to sit during gladiator fights, which they once could observe alongside their men, except at the top and alone. Regarding fights between athletes, he strictly forbade women from entering the theater before the fifth hour.

== The religious significance of the spectacles ==
Originally each festival had a religious cult linked to it. For example: the fishing contest that took place on June 8 in the presence of the praetor and ended with an eating of fried fish was originally, as Festus testifies, a substitute sacrifice in honor of the god Vulcan, who accepted the exchange of pisciculi (small fish) pro animis humanis (in place of human souls).

The religious sacrificial significance, which the Romans had now forgotten, was still present in the horse race held in the Forum on October 13. The winning horse was immolated, its blood spilled for lustrations, its head hotly contested between the inhabitants of the Via Sacra and those of the Suburra who competed for the honor of displaying the relic of the "October horse." This festival was a reminder of the horse race that the Latins of ancient Rome celebrated at the end of the annual war expedition that began in the spring and ended in the fall. In those bygone days the blood of the winning horse that was sacrificed served to purify the city.

The sacred character was also present in the Republican age when in 105 BC gladiatorial fights were instituted by the state, originally born as a cult rendered by private individuals at the tomb of their parents. The religious character was preserved in the term munus (public office) that designated these bloody fights that were meant to appease the gods. Even in the second century AD Festus calls them "oblations offered on official grounds," Tertullian, "obligatory honors to the Mani," and Ausonius, "blood shed on earth to appease the god armed with a sickle."

By the imperial era, Roman audiences had completely forgotten these religious references even though a certain ritual etiquette had been established since the time of Augustus: spectators, for example, had to wear the gala toga:

"He strove to bring back the fashion and custom of former times: one day, seeing in a gathering of the people a crowd of ill-dressed people, he indignantly exclaimed, "Here are the Romans, masters of the world and the people wearing the toga," and instructed the Aediles, after that, not to tolerate anyone stopping in and around the Forum unless he or she first dropped the cloak that covered the toga."

— Suetonius, Augustus, 40.

Spectators would be turned away if they acted impolitely; eating or drinking during the performances was prohibited. Audience members would stand during the procession as a sign of respect for the imperial dynastic patrons of the performances

The ancient religious imprint of the games for the Romans of the imperial age had now been reduced to formalities that bore no relation to the rituals of a religion now forgotten and had been replaced by the astrological symbolism depicted in the arena, which represented the earth, and in the moat surrounding the track, the sea; the obelisk (spina) symbolized the sun at the top of the sky; the seven laps of the chariot race track reproduced the orbit of the seven planets and the succession of the seven days of the week; the twelve doors of the chariot sheds facing the circus depicted the places of the zodiac.

== The relationship between the prince and the crowd ==
Propitium Caesarem ut in ludicro precabantur.
They begged Caesar's favor as if they were at the public games.

When the emperor appeared in the circus, amphitheater, or theater, the crowd greeted him by standing up and waving white handkerchiefs, paying homage to him and manifesting their presence and their emotional, almost religious, co-participation in his witnessing the same spectacle taking place in common sight.

Of this crowd of spectators who had the good fortune "to see the prince in person in the midst of his people," the emperor also made it an instrument of political power by forging, through his direct relationship with the crowd in the spectacles, the public opinion that, in the absence of the ancient Comitia and the autonomy of the Senate, no longer had a way of expressing itself.

The spectacles thus strengthened the political power of the prince and at the same time safeguarded what remained of traditional religion. Spectacles, in a population where 150,000 people lived without working at the expense of the state and where those who had employment had half the day free of commitments, including, forcibly, political ones, served to occupy leisure time and to distract and channel passions, instincts, and violence.

A people that yawns is ripe for revolt. The Caesars did not let the Roman plebs yawn, either from hunger or boredom: the spectacles were the great diversion to the unemployment of their subjects, and, consequently, the certain tool for absolutism.

— Carcopino 1971, p. 239

Suetonius reports that Augustus, when he attended the games, usually sat in the dining room of one of his friends or freedmen, sometimes sitting in his tribune, together with his wife and children. He would absent himself from the performances sometimes for several hours, sometimes for days, apologizing and recommending to the people the magistrates who were to take his place in his absence. When he attended, he was very attentive and participative to avoid discontent, since the people in the past had complained about his adoptive father, Gaius Julius Caesar, who used to devote himself during the games to reading letters and petitions. Augustus took supreme pleasure in attending them, something he never made a secret of.

It happened, then, that he frequently offered, even at his own expense, gladiatorial spectacles and games organized by others, with crowns and rich prizes. He did not attend any contest of performances of Greek origin and setting without honoring each of the participants on his own merit. He had particular interest in boxing matches, especially the Latin ones, which he often compared with the Greek ones, and not only among professionals, but also among commoners fighting on street corners, without special boxing technique. To the athletes he preserved their privileges, indeed increased them, and forbade gladiators to fight without adequate reward; as for the histrions, he limited to the period of the games and the theater the coercive power of the magistrates, which previously a law had extended to everywhere and to any period. He always demanded strict discipline in competitions among athletes or in gladiatorial combat. He repressed, finally, some behavior judged morally disordered by the histrions, and when he learned that a certain Stephanius, author of fabulae togatae, was being served at the table by a woman with her hair cut in a boyish fashion, he banished him and had him beaten with rods in three theaters.

== The spectacles ==
=== Agons ===
The main sports in ancient Rome were: pankration, wrestling, boxing, running, javelin throw, discus throw, and shot put, which were modeled after Ancient Greece. The conception of sports in Ancient Rome, however, did not reflect the Greek culture's predilection for nonprofessional athletic activities, for agons (ἀγῶνες), bloodless contests concerning not only sports but also different fields of human activities, where the winner received a prize for demonstrating, according to the Greek mentality, his or her superior physical and moral gifts. Forty years before the conquest of Greece, even before its civilization influenced the Roman civilization, certamina graeca, such as those instituted by Marcus Fulvius Nobilior in 186 BC, were considered by Roman society to be immoral exhibitions devoid of the practical purposes that gave meaning to military gymnastic training for the exercise of war. The intellectual Tacitus wrote that he feared, as did the part of Roman society most attached to traditions, that Greek refinements might invalidate ancient values:

What is left today [for young people] but to show themselves naked, take the boxing gloves and think about those fights instead of military service.

— Tacitus, Annals, XIV, 20

In the same vein should be considered the aversion of the senatorial class to those emperors infatuated with Greek civilization such as Caligula or Nero, who aroused scandal by taking pleasure in attending the games in person.

=== Chariot racing ===
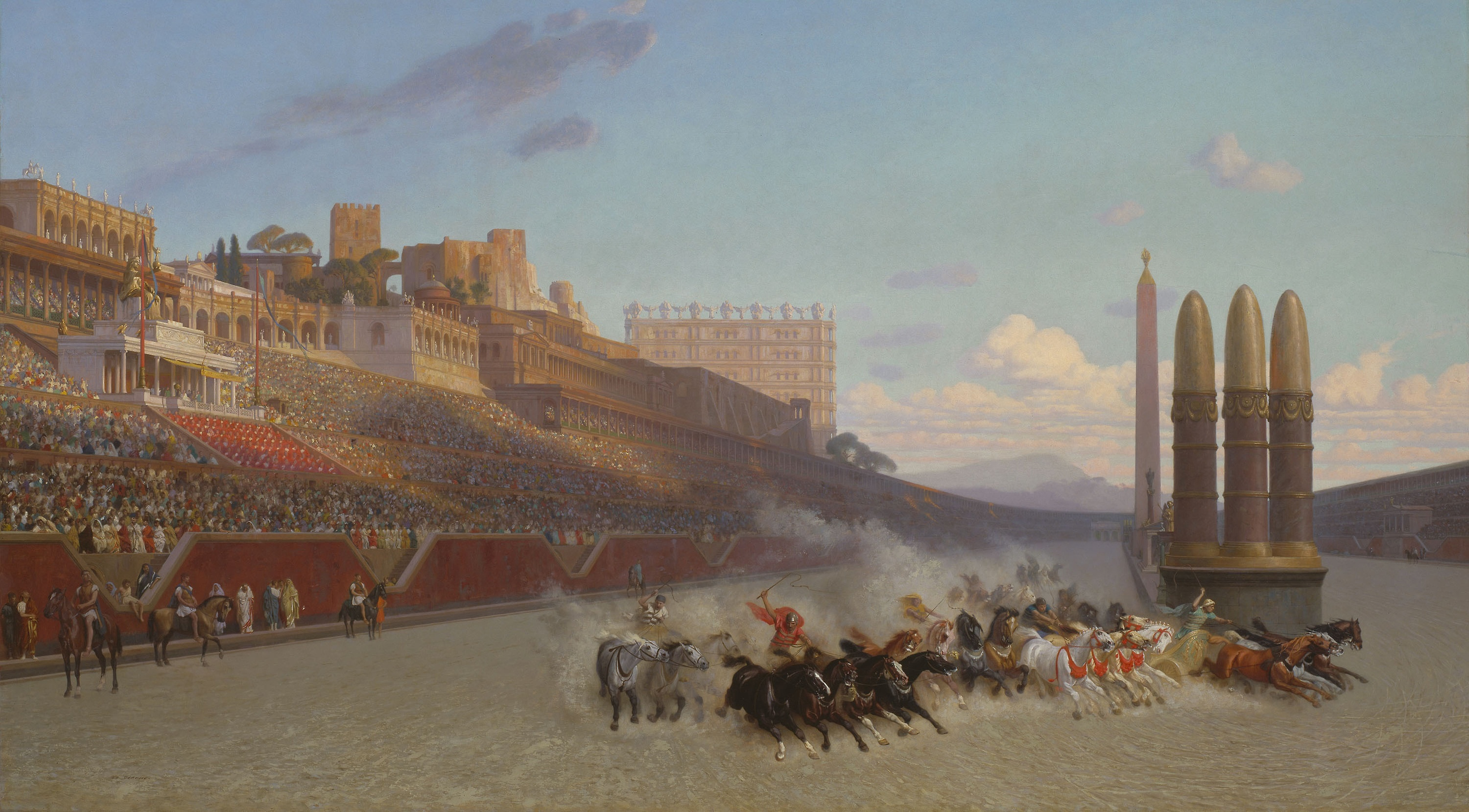
The chariot race at the Circus Maximus as seen from the entrance gate, with the imperial box and the Palatine on the left (painting by Jean-Léon Gérôme, 1876)

Most likely the Romans borrowed the custom of organizing chariot races from the Etruscans, who in turn had borrowed it from the Greeks. However, Roman customs were influenced by the Greeks in a direct way, especially after they conquered mainland Greece in 146 BC. According to one Roman legend Romulus used the stratagem of organizing a chariot race shortly after the founding of Rome to distract the Sabines. While the Sabines were enjoying the spectacle Romulus and his men captured and kidnapped the Sabine women. This event is traditionally known as the Rape of the Sabine Women.

In ancient Rome, the main structure designated to host chariot races was the Circus Maximus, located in the valley between the Palatine and Aventine hills, which could accommodate up to 250,000 spectators. The construction of the Circus Maximus probably dates back to Etruscan times, but it was rebuilt around 50 BC by order of Julius Caesar, reaching a length of about 600 meters with a width of about 225 meters. One end of the track, the one where the chariots were lined up at the start, was wider than the other. To organize the starts, the Romans used a series of barriers called carceres, a term that has the same meaning as the Greek hysplex. They were placed in steps like the hysplexes, but there were some slight differences because the Roman tracks had a median separating barrier, the spina, in the center of the track itself. The carceres were set up at one of the vertices of the track, and the wagons were arranged behind these barriers that were secured by a snap system. When all the chariots were ready, the emperor (or the organizer of the races if they were not held in Rome) would drop a cloth known as a map thus starting the race. The barriers then opened all at once allowing an equal start for all participants.

Once the race began, chariots could move freely around the track to try to cause an accident to their opponents by pushing them against the spinae. On the spinae were "eggs," large signals similar to the "dolphins" of Greek races, which were dropped into a gutter of water that flowed through the center of the spina to signal the number of laps to go until the end. The spina ended up becoming a very elaborate construction-decorated with statues, obelisks and other works of art-to such an extent that spectators often could not follow the chariots when they were on the opposite side (but apparently they thought this fact made the experience more exciting by increasing suspense). At the two ends of the spina were the two curves of the course (called metae), and there, as in Greek races, spectacular collisions and accidents occurred. Accidents that resulted in the destruction of chariots and serious injuries to horses and charioteers were called naufragia, the same term for shipwrecks. The course of the race was also very similar to that of the Greek races, and the main difference was that dozens of races could be held in each day, and the events sometimes lasted for hundreds of days consecutively. A race, however, was held over the distance of only 7 laps (and in later times 5, so that more races could be held on the same day) instead of the 12 of which the Greek race-type was composed. The Roman organization was also much more interested in economic aspects: the runners were professionals and a huge betting round was widespread among the public. The chariots in the race could be drawn by four horses (quadrigae) or two horses (bigae), but races among those with four horses were more important. In some rare cases, when a charioteer wanted to demonstrate his skill, he could employ up to ten horses, but it was a practice that combined great difficulty with little actual utility. Roman charioteers, unlike Greek charioteers, wore a helmet and other body protectors and tied the reins around their waists, while the Greeks held them in their hands. Because of the latter custom, the Romans could not let go of the reins in case of an accident, so they often ended up being dragged by the horses around the track until they were either killed or managed to free themselves: this is why they carried a knife with them to be able to get out of such situations. The most famous and best reconstruction of a Roman chariot race, despite not actually being historically accurate in several respects, can be seen in the 1959 film Ben-Hur.

=== Gladiators ===
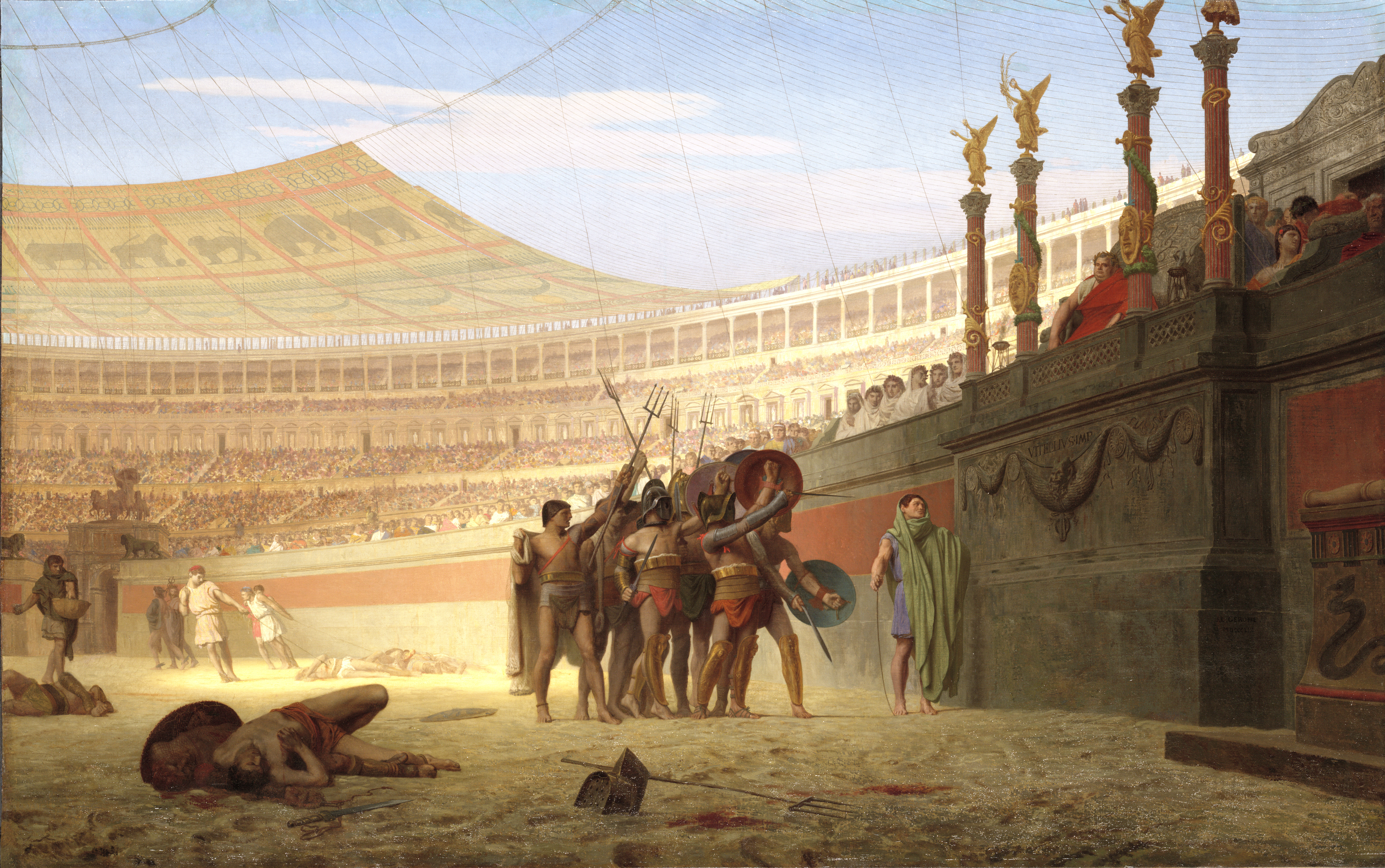
The most iconic of Roman spectacles, the gladiatorial spectacle, depicted here in the Ave, Caesar, morituri te salutant addressed by the gladiators to Vitellius in front of the jubilant crowds in Rome (painting by Jean-Léon Gérôme, 1859)

The origin of gladiatorial combat is open to debate, although there is a tendency to interpret it as a practice from Etruria that, like many other aspects of Etruscan culture, was adopted by the Romans. There is systematic evidence of it beginning with Roman funeral rites during the Punic Wars (3rd century BC), and from then on it quickly became an essential element of the Roman world's politics and social life. The munera gladiatoria, in particular, were due to the custom of wealthier individuals to offer the people, at their own expense, public spectacles on special occasions, such as duels to the death between slaves on the occasion of the funeral of some relative. The munera could be ordinaria, that is, scheduled on certain holidays, or extraordinaria to celebrate particular occasions. The popularity of gladiators led to their use in increasingly lavish and expensive ludi. Gladiatorial games lasted for nearly a thousand years, reaching their peak between the first century BCE and the second century CE. The Flavian dynasty, which began with Emperor Vespasian, endowed Rome with special monumental infrastructures expressly dedicated to the munera: first and foremost, the Flavian Amphitheater, which has gone down in history as the "Colosseum," inaugurated by Emperor Titus, to which were added the imperial gladiatorial schools, the ludi (Ludus Magnus, Ludus Gallicus, Ludus Matutinus and Ludus Dacicus), built by Emperor Domitian. The Flavians and their successors thus had a privileged stage and a dedicated "assembly line" for their expensive and bloody spectacles. Between 108 and 109 CE, Trajan celebrated his Dacian victories using 10,000 gladiators and 11,000 animals in ludi lasting 123 days. The cost of gladiators and munera continued to rise out of all control. Marcus Aurelius' 177 AD legislation did little to solve the problem, and the subsequent reign of Commodus, Marcus Aurelius' son and heir, was marked by inordinate use of munera and venationes. Christians disapproved of the games because they involved idolatrous pagan rites, and the popularity of gladiatorial contests declined in the fifth century, leading to their demise.

The first munera took place at or near the tomb of the deceased and these were organized by a munerator, lit. "the one who made the offering." Later games were held by an editor, identical to the munerator or an official employed by him. Over time, these titles and meanings may have merged. In Republican times, private citizens could own and train gladiators, or rent them from a lanista (owner of a gladiator training school -see below). From the Principate onward, private citizens could hold munera and own gladiators only with imperial permission, and the role of editor was increasingly tied to state officialdom. Claudius's legislation required quaestors, the lowest rank of Roman magistrate, to personally subsidize two-thirds of the cost of games for their communities in the case of small towns, thus formalizing a fixed cash outlay that was at once an advertisement of the politician's personal generosity and a partial buyout of their duty. More important games were organized by high-ranking magistrates who could better afford them. The largest and most lavish of all were paid for by the emperor himself.

The first types of gladiators were named after the enemies of the Republic of Rome: the Samnites, Thracians, and Gauls. The Samnite, heavily and elegantly armed and probably the most popular type, was renamed Secutor and the Gaul renamed Murmillo, as the lands inhabited by those peoples were absorbed into the empire. In the mid-Republican munus, each type of gladiator fought either with his own kind or with an equated type. In the late Republic and early Empire, various types of "fantasy" were introduced as well as opposing but contrasting types of gladiators who were different but complementaryː e.g., the agile Retiarius ("net man"), bareheaded, armored only on his left arm and shoulder, used the net and trident and then charged with his dagger at the more heavily armored Secutor protected by a solid helmet. Most depictions of gladiators show the most common and popular types, with respect to which there are reliable historical reconstructions available to us today. Other innovations introduced in this period included gladiators fighting on war chariots or in cavalry formations.

The gladiator trade was empire-wide and subject to official supervision. Rome's military success produced a supply of soldier-prisoners who were redistributed for use in mines or state-owned amphitheaters and for sale on the open market. For example, in the aftermath of the First Jewish War, gladiatorial schools received an influx of Jews: those rejected for training were sent directly to the arenas as noxii (lit. "the hurtful ones"), while the sturdier ones were sent to Rome. In Rome's military ethos, enemy soldiers who had surrendered or allowed their own capture and enslavement were granted an undeserved gift of life. Their training as gladiators amounted to a redemption of honor through munus.

=== Naumachiae ===
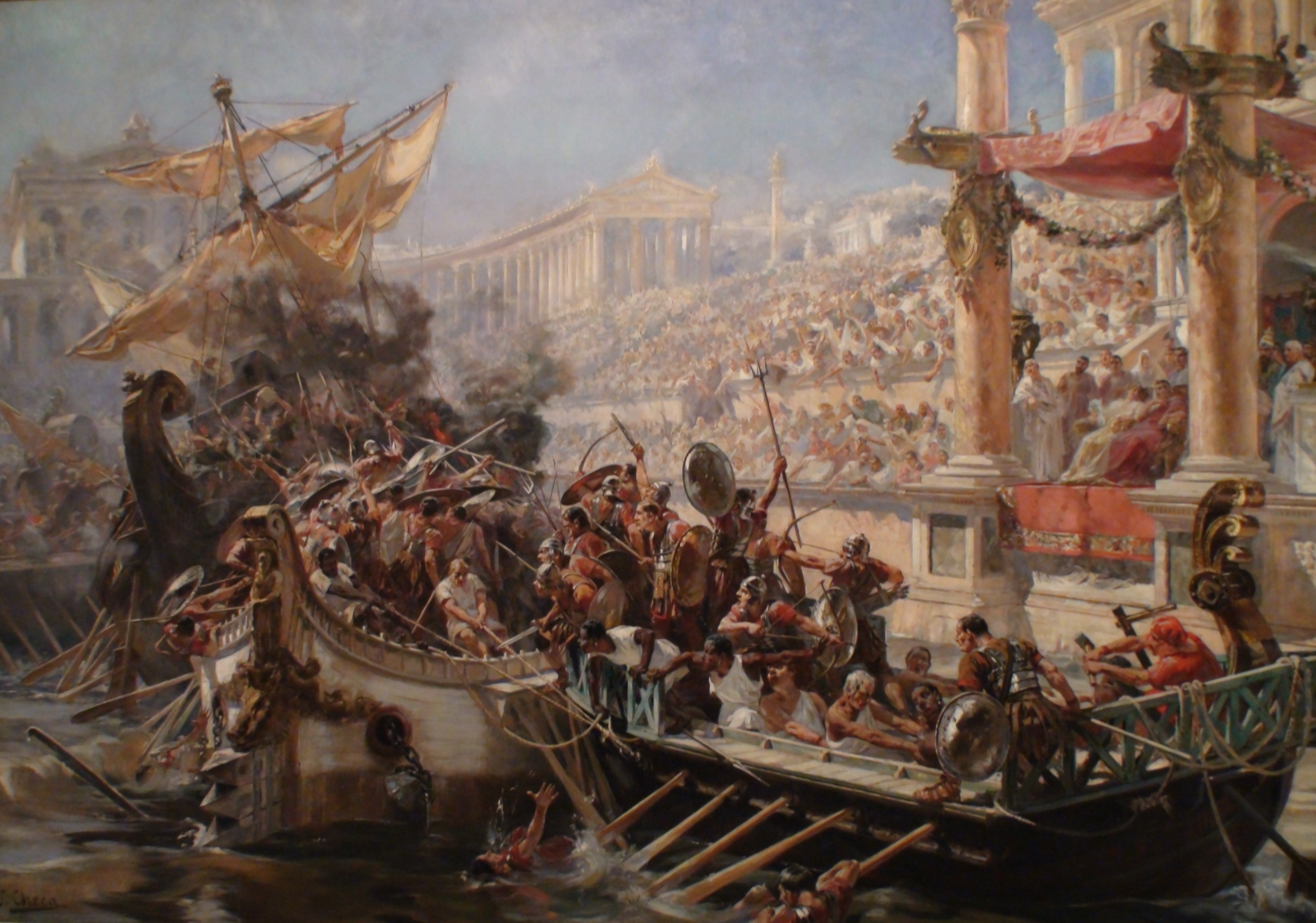
The naumachia, lit. "naval battle," which Emperor Augustus prepared before a huge crowd that flocked from all over Rome (painting by Ulpiano Checa, 1894)

The naumachia (Latin naumachia, from ancient Greek ναυμαχία/naumachía, literally "naval combat") denotes in the Roman world both a spectacle representing a naval battle and the reservoir, or in a broader sense the building in which they were held.

The first known naumachia was the one organized by Julius Caesar in Rome in 46 BC for his fourfold triumph. After having a large reservoir dug near the Tiber in the Campus Martius, capable of containing real biremes, triremes, and quadriremes, he hired from among the prisoners of war 2,000 fighters and 4,000 oarsmen. In 2 BC, for the inauguration of the temple of Mars Ultor (Avenging Mars), Augustus organized a naumachia that faithfully reproduced the one of Caesar. As he himself recalls in the Res gestæ, he had a reservoir dug on the right bank of the Tiber, in the place called the "forest of the Caesars" (nemus Caesarum), where 3,000 men, not counting the oarsmen, on 30 vessels with rostrums, and many smaller units faced each other.

Claudius in 52 held a naumachia on a vast natural body of water, Fucine Lake, to inaugurate its drainage works through the opening of Claudius' tunnels. The combatants were convicts sentenced to death. It is known in particular from Suetonius that the naumachiarii (fighters in the naumachia) before the battle greeted the emperor with a phrase that has become famous: Morituri te salutant. An erroneous tradition has appropriated it to make it a ritual phrase of the gladiators to the emperor, when in fact it is attested only on this occasion.

The naumachia was thus a more deadly spectacle than that of the gladiators: the latter engaged lesser personnel, and the battles did not systematically end with the death of the vanquished. The appearance of the naumachiae is closely related to that, somewhat earlier, of another spectacle, the "combat between troops," which did not engage combatants in pairs, but two small armies. Precisely in the latter the combatants were more often convicts without specific training than real gladiators. Caesar, creator of the naumachia, simply transposed the principle of land battle formations to a naval setting.

However, in relation to troop combats, naumachia had the peculiarity of developing historical or pseudo-historical themes: each fleet facing each other embodied a people famous for their maritime power in classical Greece or the Hellenistic East: Egyptians and Phoenicians for Caesar's naumachia, Persians and Athenians for Augustus', Sicels and Rhodians for Claudius'. Moreover, it required considerable means, greater than even the largest troop battles. This factor made naumachia a spectacle reserved for exceptional occasions, closely linked to celebrations of the emperor, his victories and his monuments. The irreducible specificity of the spectacle and its themes drawn from the history of the Greek world explains the origin of the term: a phonetic transcription of the Greek word for a naval battle (ναυμαχία / naumakhía), later also indicating the vast reservoirs dedicated to it.

=== Theater ===
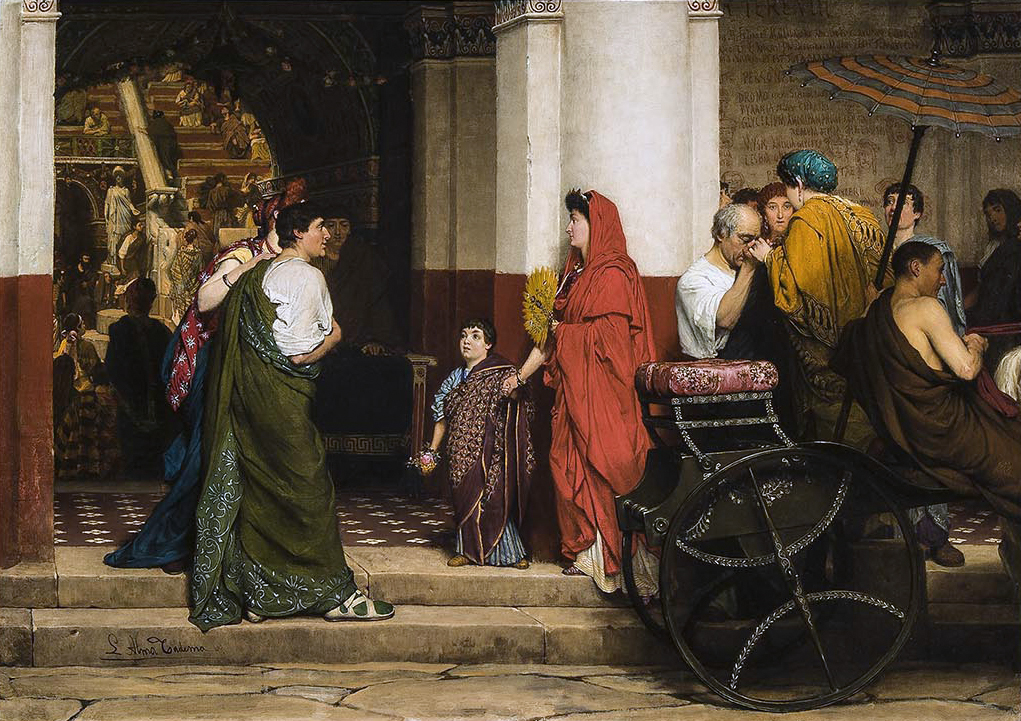
Roman citizens entering a theater to attend a performance (painting by Lawrence Alma-Tadema, 1866)

In ancient Rome, theater represented one of the highest expressions of Latin culture. By the middle of the third century BC. multiple forms of dramatic performance had already developed in the Italian peninsula, owing both to Greek influence and to local traditions, including: (i) in Etruria and Rome the fescennine had developed, which was sometimes accompanied by music and dance performances or sports games; (ii) in the south of Campania Atellan Farce was widespread; (iii) finally, in the Dorian colonies of southern Italy and Sicily, phlyax plays were performed; and in Taranto, the Italic cradle of the dramatic art that came to Rome thanks precisely to a Tarentine author, in particular, the poet Rhinthon (323–285 BC) who had given literary form to mythological parody.

The theatrical genres that have remained with us and are best documented are both of Greek origin, the palliata (comedy) and the cothurnata (tragedy -from cothurnus, the typical footwear of tragic actors), and with a Roman setting, called togata or trabeata (comedy) and praetexta (tragedy) respectively. The togata is distinguished from more popular comic genres, such as the Atellan Farce, juxtaposed with commedia dell'arte, and mime. Roman subject tragedy (praetexta) was renewed in events, considering historical facts. The tabernaria, on the other hand, was a comic play with a Roman setting.

Roman theater reached its zenith with Livius Andronicus, Gnaeus Naevius, Plautus, and Terence for comedy and Seneca for tragedy:

- The theatrical production of Livius Andronicus (280–200 BC) shifted the attention of the Romans from pre-literary comic works to the tragic genre. Andronicus, with whom the Archaic Age of Latin literature is usually said to begin, was the first author, albeit of Greek origin, to compose a play in Latin, performed in 240 BC at the ludi scaenici organized for the Roman victory in the First Punic War. No fragments of that work are preserved, and it is not even possible to determine whether it was a comedy or a tragedy.
- The innovation that Gnaeus Naevius (275–201 BC) brought to Latin literature was the introduction of the praetexta, a tragedy set in Rome instead of Greece. Two titles are known: Romulus (or Lupus) and Clastidium. In Romulus the story of Romulus and Remus is told; Clastidium tells of the battle of Clastidium in 222 BC won by Marcellus against the Gauls, a victory that enabled the Romans to conquer Cisalpine Gaul. Nevius also wrote six cothurnate tragedies, that is, tragedies with a Greek subject: Aesiona, Danae, Equos Troianus, Iphigenia, Hector Proficiscens and Lycurgus. Danae and Equos Troianus (the latter presented at the opening of Pompey's theater in Rome in 55 BCE.) repeat titles from Livius Andronicus, and the best known is Lycurgus, the story of the Thracian king Lycurgus (not to be confused with the mythical Spartan lawgiver) who drove the god Bacchus and the Bacchae out of his land, provoking the baleful wrath of the wine god, who retaliated by killing the king and setting fire to his palace (a theme relevant to Rome where the cult of Dionysus had been introduced in the last decades of the 3rd century BC. C. as a propitiatory-orgiastic rite forbidden by a ruling by the senatus consultum de Bacchanalibus), of which 24 fragments have remained to this day. As far as comic production is concerned, that of Nevius makes him the most important predecessor of Plautus in this field; from the fragments that have come down to us we note a colorful verbal inventiveness that seems to prepare the field for that of Plautus.
- Titus Maccius Plautus (255–184 BC) was an author of enormous success, both immediate and posthumous, and of great prolificacy: it seems that during the second century as many as 130 comedies related to his name circulated, but it is unknown how many were authentic. Plautus' great strength lies in the comedy that arises from individual situations, taken one after another, and from the verbal creativity that each new situation can unleash. However, only a direct reading can restore an adequate impression of all this: and if Plautus' comic art by its very nature escapes overly closed formulas, greater systematicity arises precisely from the consideration of the plots, in their most basic constructive lines. In Plautus' comedy it is possible to distinguish, according to an already ancient subdivision, the deverbia and the cantica, that is, the dialogic parts, with several actors interlocuting with each other, and the sung parts, mostly monologues, but sometimes also dialogues between two or even three characters. The pattern of love intrigue often recurs, with a young man (adulescens) falling in love with a girl. His love dream always encounters problems in turning into reality depending on the woman he falls in love with: if she is a courtesan he has to find the money to marry her, if she is honest the obstacle is a family one. Helping him to overcome the various difficulties is the servus callidus (tricky slave) or the parasite (penniless man who helps him in exchange for food) who with various deceptions and pitfalls manages to overcome the various difficulties and get the two married. The pranks organized by the servus are some of the most significant elements of Plautian comedy. The servus is one of the figures most widely used by Plautus in his comedies and is central to Plautian metatheater: he is in fact the character who takes on the role of the poet's alter idem as the creator of deception.
- Publius Terentius Afer (190–159 BC) wrote only six comedies, all of which have been preserved in their entirety to the present day. Terence adapted himself to Greek comedy; in particular, he followed the models of the Attic New Comedy (νέα κωμῳδία) and, above all, Menander. Because of this strong artistic connection with the Greek playwright, he was called by Julius Caesar the "Menander dimidiatus". Terence's work was not limited to a simple translation and re-proposition of the Greek originals but connotes itself as contaminatio, that is, the introduction into the comedy of characters and episodes belonging to different comedies, which were also of Greek origin. Part of Terence's fortune can be attributed to the abilities of his actor, Lucius Ambivius Turpio, one of the best at the time. Compared to Plautus, Terence aimed at a more cultured audience so much so that in some comedies some socio-cultural topics of the Scipionic Circle, of which he was a member, can be found. In addition, in contrast to the Plautian comedies, called motoria because of their excessive showmanship and characterized by the figure of the servus currens, estrangement, and the presence of cantica, Terence's work is called stataria, because they are relatively serious and do not include moments of metatheatery or cantica. Given the greater sophistication of his plays, it can be said that with Terence simple audiences move away from the theater, something that had never happened before. Another difference is the care taken with the plots, which are more coherent and less complex than those of the Plautian comedies, but also more engaging since Terence, unlike Plautus, does not use an expository prologue (containing the antecedents and an anticipation of the plot). Particularly important in Terence is also the moral message underlying his entire work, aimed at emphasizing his humanitas, that is, his respect for every other human being, while being aware of each person's limitations.
- The tragedies of Lucius Anneus Seneca (4–65 AD) are the only Latin tragic works that have come down to us in non-fragmentary form and thus constitute a valuable testimony both to an entire literary genre and to the revival of Latin tragic theater, after the vain attempts implemented by Augustan cultural policy to promote a revival of theatrical activity. In the Julio-Claudian age (27 BC – 68 AD) and the early Flavian age (69–96) the senatorial intellectual elite resorted to tragic theater to express their opposition to the regime (Latin tragedy takes up and exalts a fundamental aspect in classical Greek tragedy, namely, its republican inspiration and execration of tyranny). Not surprisingly, the tragedians of the Julio-Claudian and Flavian ages were all prominent figures in Roman public life. There are nine tragedies believed to be authentic (plus a tenth, the Octavia, believed to be spurious), all of them with Greek mythological subjects. Works, perhaps, intended primarily for reading, which may not have excluded stage performance at times. The cumbersomeness or grim spectacularity of some scenes would seem to presuppose a stage performance, whereas a simple reading would have limited the effects sought by the dramatic text. The various tragic events take the form of clashes of opposing forces and conflict between reason and passion. Although themes and motifs from philosophical works are taken up in the tragedies, the Senecian theater is not merely an illustration, in the form of exempla provided by myth, of Stoic doctrine, both because the specifically literary matrix remains strong and because, in the tragic universe, the logos, the rational principle to which Stoic doctrine entrusts the government of the world, proves incapable of curbing the passions and stemming the spread of evil. The various tragic events are set against the background of a reality with dark and atrocious tones, giving the conflict between good and evil a cosmic dimension and universal scope. Of particular prominence is the figure of the bloodthirsty and power-hungry tyrant, closed to moderation and leniency, tormented by fear and anguish. The despot provides the cue for the ethical debate on power, which is most important in Seneca's reflection. Of almost all the Senecian tragedies, the Greek models remain, in relation to which Seneca has a great autonomy, which, however, presupposes an ongoing relationship with the model, on which the author makes interventions of contamination, restructuring, and rationalization in the dramatic structure.

=== Venationes ===
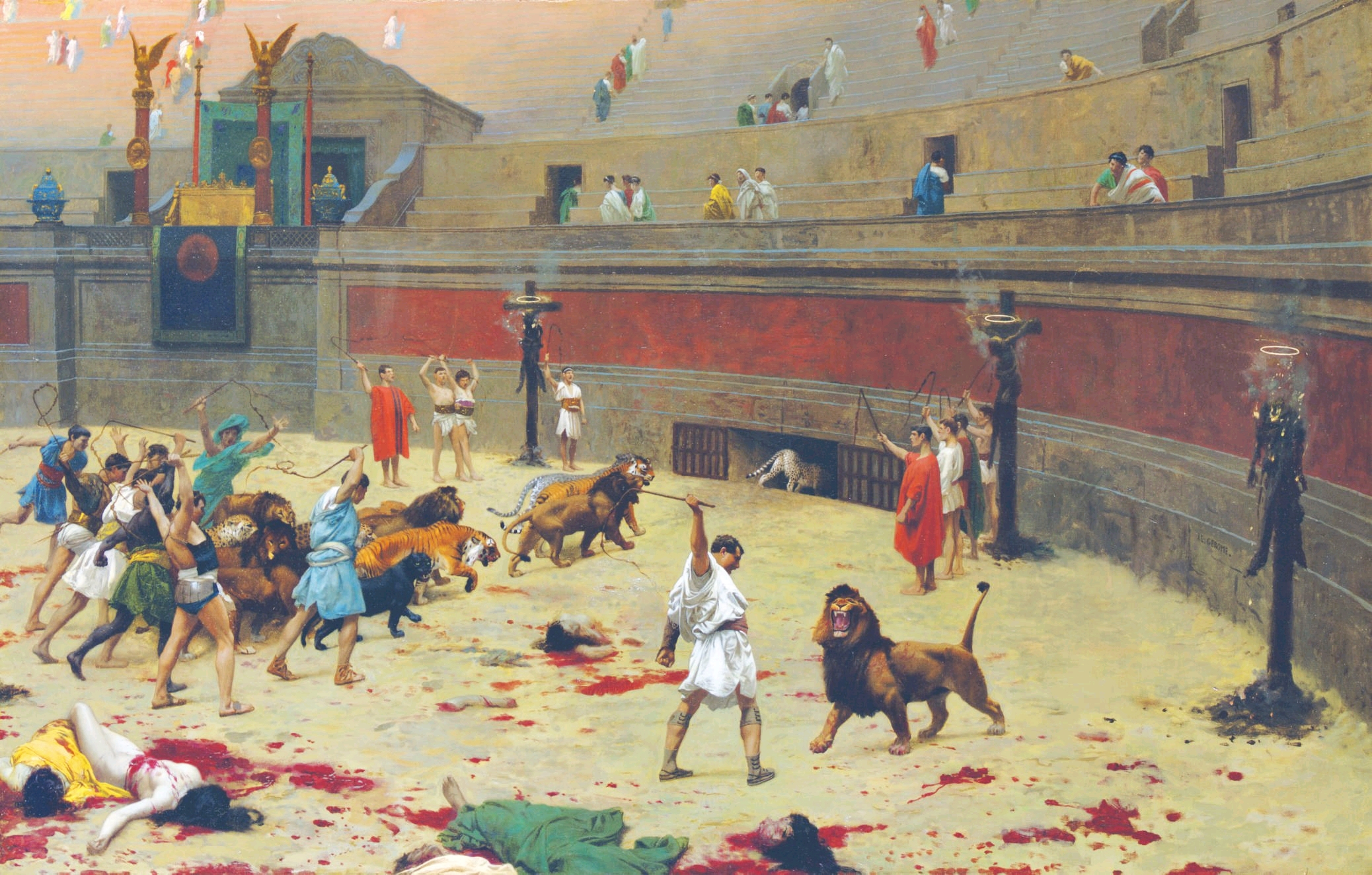
The various spectacles in which the Romans used lions, tigers and other beasts required well-trained personnel to tame, as well as fight, the animals (painting by Jean-Léon Gérôme, 1902)

Venationes (sing. venatio) were a form of entertainment that involved hunting and killing wild animals. Wild and exotic beasts were brought to Rome from the far reaches of the empire, and venationes were held during the morning before the main afternoon event, the gladiatorial duels. These hunts were held in the Roman Forum, the Saepta, and the Circus Maximus, although none of these venues offered protection to the crowd from the wild animals in the arena. Special precautions, such as erecting barriers and digging ditches, were taken to prevent animals from escaping from these places. Very few animals escaped these hunts, although they sometimes defeated the bestiarius, or hunter of wild beasts. Thousands of wild animals were slaughtered in a day. For example, during the games held by Trajan when he became emperor, more than 9,000 animals were killed. Not all animals were ferocious, although most were. Animals that appeared in the venationes included lions, tigers, leopards, elephants, bears, deer, wild goats, and camels.

== See also ==
- Venatio
- Naumachia
- Chariot racing
- Bread and circuses

== Bibliography ==
- Suetonius. De vita Caesarum, books I-II-III.
- Terence (2005). Del Corno, D. (ed.). Adelphoe (18ª ed.). Rizzoli. ISBN 88-17-16616-2.
- Beare, William (2008). I Romani a teatro. Translated by De Nonno, Mario. Bari-Roma: Laterza. ISBN 978-88-420-2712-6.
- Carcopino, Jérôme (1971). La vita quotidiana a Roma. Bari: Universale Laterza.
- Gregori, Gianluca (2011). Ludi e munera. 25 Anni di Ricerche sugli Spettacoli d'Età Romana. LED Edizioni Universitarie. ISBN 978-88-7916-479-5.
- Futrell, A. (2006). A Sourcebook on the Roman Games. Oxford, United Kingdom: Blackwell Publishing. ISBN 1-4051-1568-8.
- Kyle, D. G. (1998). Spectacles of Death in Ancient Rome. London: Routledge. ISBN 0-415-09678-2.
- Kyle, D. G. (2007). Sport and Spectacle in the Ancient World. Oxford: Blackwell Publishing. ISBN 978-0-631-22970-4.
- Wiedemann, T. (1992). Emperors and Gladiators. London: Routledge. ISBN 0-415-12164-7.
