= Gaianum =

The Gaianum was an area in the Transtiberim in ancient Rome. It is located in Regio XIV, about 300m northwest of the Mausoleum of Hadrian, south of the Naumachia Vaticana built by Trajan, and east of the Via Triumphalis. The historian Cassius Dio says that Caligula, also commonly known in ancient sources as Gaius, used the Gaianum for chariot exercises. A number of victory statues have been found in the area, but seem to have been installed originally at the Circus of Gaius and Nero. The Gaianum was probably only a track, not a circus building as such.

The Calendar of Philocalus (354 AD) lists an Initium Caiani on March 28, at the conclusion of an Imperial-era religious festival for Cybele and Attis that began March 22. The older Republican festival of the Megalesia for Cybele as Magna Mater ran April 4–10. The regionary catalogues connect the Gaianum to the Phrygianum, a sanctuary of the Magna Mater on the Vatican Hill. Some scholars think an initiation rite in connection with the cult was held on March 28, with the Gaianum substituting for the Phrygianum when it was made inaccessible by the construction of St. Peter's beginning in the early 4th century. March 28 was also the date of Caligula's entry (initium) into Rome in 37 AD, when he was acclaimed as princeps, and the festival may originate with him, with no relation to the cult of Cybele.
