= Peregrine of Auxerre =

Third-century bishop

Saint Peregrine of Auxerre
- Born: Rome
- Died: c. 304 AD; Bouhy, France
- Venerated in: Catholic Church
- Feast: May 16
- Attributes: converting pagans; overturning idols; founding Auxerre cathedral; sometimes in the dress of a pilgrim in reference to his name (peregrinus means pilgrim in Latin); snake
- Patronage: against snake bites

Peregrine (Peregrinus) of Auxerre (French: Saint Pèlerin, Italian: San Pellegrino) (d. ca. 261 AD or ca. 304 AD) is venerated as the first bishop of Auxerre and the builder of its first cathedral. A strong local tradition states that he was a priest of Rome appointed by Pope Sixtus II to evangelize this area at the request of the Christians resident in that part of Gaul. He preached at Marseille, Lyon, and converted most of the inhabitants of Auxerre to Christianity.

At Intaranum –present-day Entrains-sur-Nohain– Peregrine angered the governor after he appealed to the populace to abandon pagan idols; the inhabitants had been dedicating a new temple to Jupiter.

The Martyrologium Hieronymianum states that he was tortured and beheaded at vicus Baiacus (Bouhy) (in present-day Nièvre) during the persecutions of Diocletian.

His lector Jovinian, venerated as a saint, was also martyred with him. Other companions included Marsus, his priest; Corcodomus, his deacon; and Jovian his subdeacon.

== Veneration ==
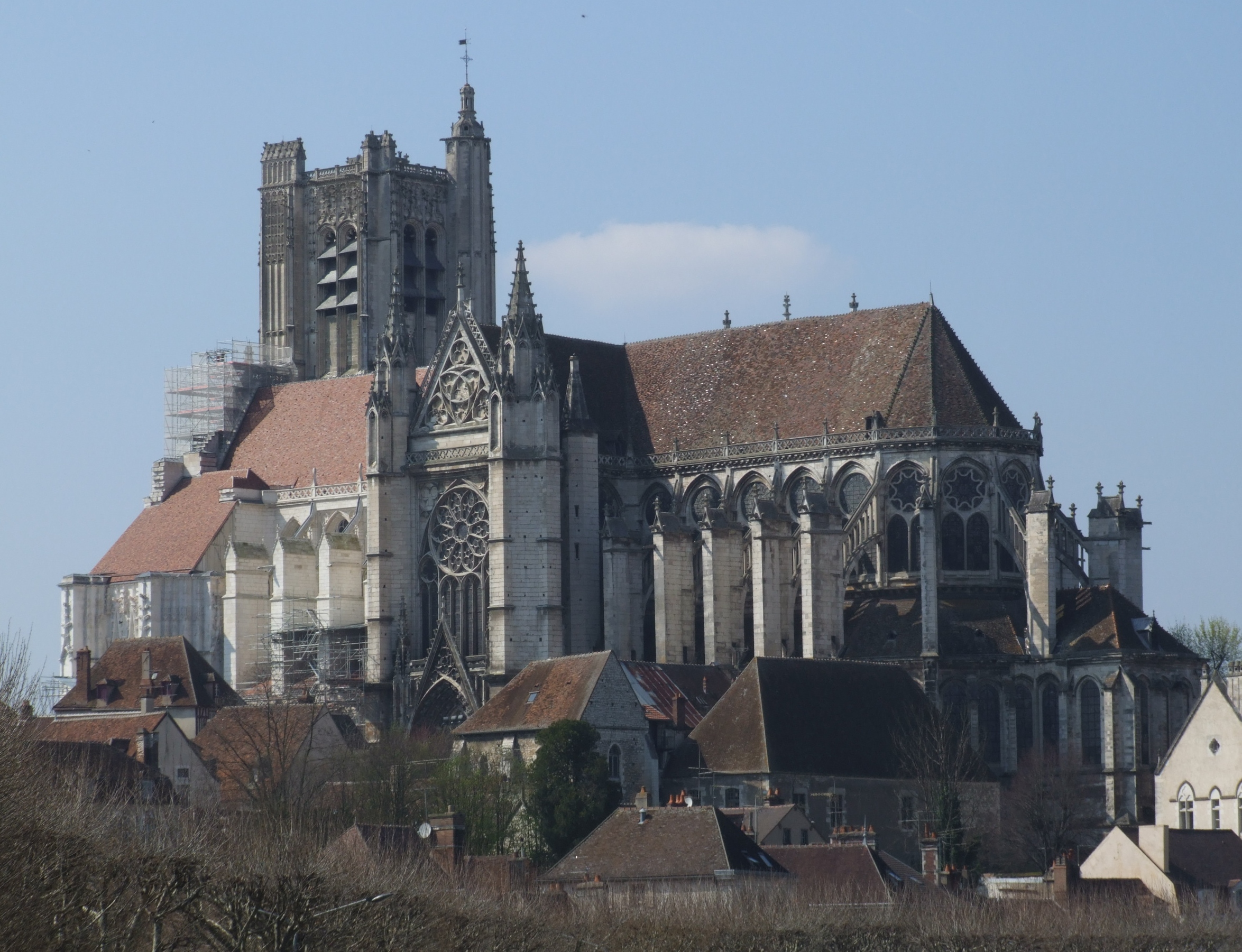
St. Peregrine is said to have founded Auxerre's cathedral, Saint-Etienne.

Historians postulate that he was probably not a bishop at all, but rather a missionary who had been sent to the rural areas of this region. In the ninth century, churchmen of Auxerre made this local martyr the first bishop of their city.

In the 7th century, some of his relics were translated from Bouhy to the Abbey of Saint-Denis. Pope Leo III ordered the construction of the church of San Pellegrino in Naumachia dedicated to Saint Peregrine in Rome near the Hospitale Francorum, which served French pilgrims. A street near the church was named San Pellegrino after the saint; it later gave its name to the Porta San Pellegrino.

In 1645, while work was being carried out underneath the altar of the church of Bouhy, a human cranium was discovered. After an investigation, this was declared a relic of Peregrine and it was solemnly brought back to Auxerre.
