= Naumachia =

Staged Roman naval battles

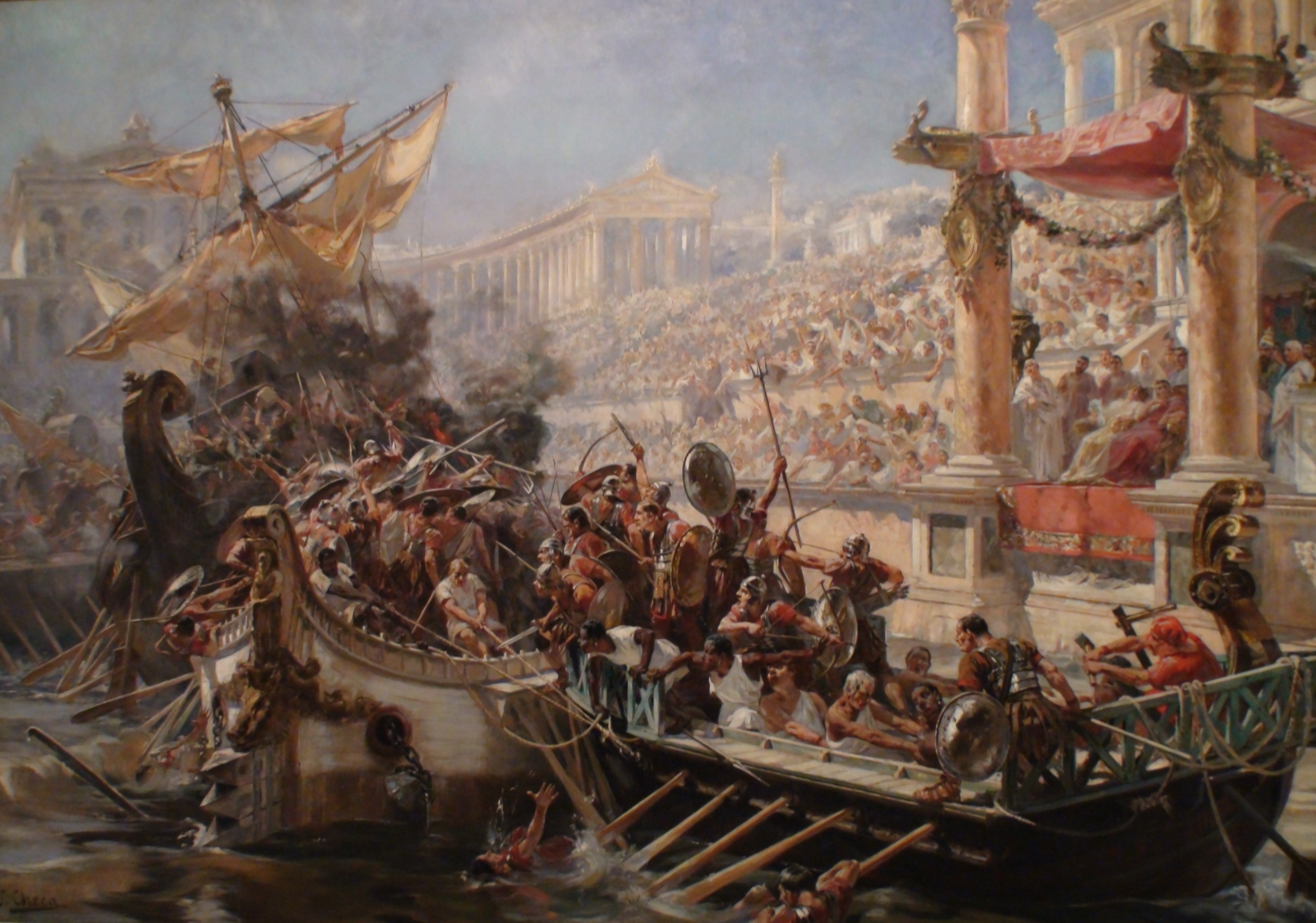
Naumachia (detail): an imaginative recreation by Ulpiano Checa, first exhibited in 1894.

A naumachia (in Latin naumachia, from the Ancient Greek ναυμαχία/naumachía, literally "naval combat") was a mock naval battle staged as mass entertainment by the Ancient Romans. The staging would typically occur in a specially-dug basin, also known as a naumachia.

== Early naumachiae ==
The first known naumachia was given by Julius Caesar in Rome in 46 BC on occasion of his quadruple triumph. After having a basin dug near the Tiber, capable of holding actual biremes, triremes and quinqueremes, he made 2,000 combatants and 4,000 rowers, all prisoners of war, fight. In 2 BC for the inauguration of the Temple of Mars Ultor ("Mars the Avenger"), Augustus gave a grander naumachia based on Caesar's model. This naumachia depicted a battle between the Greeks and the Persians and required a basin that was 365 by 550 meters, which was created straddling the Tiber. Res Gestæ (§ 23) claimed that 3000 men, not counting rowers, fought in 30 vessels with rams and several smaller boats.

In 52 AD, Claudius gave what was possibly the most "epic" of these on a natural body of water, Fucine Lake, to celebrate the completion of drainage work and tunneling on the site. It included one hundred ships and 19,000 combatants, all of whom were prisoners who had been condemned to death. Suetonius' account, written many years after the event, has them salute the emperor with the phrase "morituri te salutant" ("those who are about to die salute you"). There is no evidence that this form of address was used on any occasion other than this single naumachia.

The naumachia was thus a bloodier show than gladiatorial combat, which consisted of smaller engagements and where the combat did not necessarily end with the death of the losers. More exactly, the appearance of naumachia is closely tied and only slightly earlier than that other spectacle, "group combat", which did not pit single combatants against one another, but rather used two small armies. There again, the combatants were frequently those sentenced to death and lacked the specialized training of true gladiators. Caesar, creator of the naumachia, simply had to transpose the same principle to another environment.

Through the choreography of the combat, the naumachia had the ability to represent historical or pseudo-historical themes. Each of the fleets participating represented a maritime power of Ancient Greece or the Hellenistic east: Egyptians and the Tyrians for Caesar's naumachia, Persians and Athenians for that of Augustus, Sicilians and Rhodeans for that of Claudius. It required significantly greater resources than other such entertainments, and as such these spectacles were reserved for exceptional occasions, closely tied to celebrations of the emperor, his victories and his monuments. The specific nature of the spectacle as well as the historical themes borrowed from the Greek world are closely tied to the term naumachia. This word, a phonetic transcription of the Greek word for a naval battle (ναυμαχία/naumakhía), has since come to also refer to the large artificial basins created for them.

== Naumachia building ==
Caesar's naumachia was probably a simple basin dug into the low-lying ground on the northern or southern banks of the Tiber, and fed by its waters; the exact location is unknown; most likely Trastevere or the Campus Martius. The naumachia of Augustus is better known: in his Res Gestæ (23) Augustus himself indicates that the basin measured 1800 × 1200 Roman feet (approximately 533 × 355 meters). Pliny the Elder (Natural History, 16, 200), describes an island formed in the center, probably rectangular and connected to the shore by a bridge where the privileged spectators likely sat.

Taking into consideration the size of the basin and the dimensions of a trireme (approximately 35 × 4.90 meters), the thirty vessels used would hardly be able to manoeuvre. Knowing that the crew of a Roman trireme was approximately 170 rowers and 50 to 60 soldiers, a simple calculation allows us to see that to achieve the number of 3000 men the vessels of Augustus' fleet would have to have held more combatants than an actual fleet. The spectacle thus focused less on the movement of the vessels, and more on their actual presence in the artificial basin and the hand-to-hand combat which developed.

It was different for Claudius' naumachia. The two fleets each consisted of 50 vessels, which corresponds to the number of vessels in each of the two military fleets based at Misenum and at Ravenna. Lake Fucino was large enough that only part of it was needed, surrounded by pontoons, and there was room enough for the vessels to manoeuvre and ram each other. The naumachia of Claudius therefore truly reproduced naval combat.

According to Sextus Julius Frontinus in De aquaeductu (De aquis urbis Romæ, 11, 1–2: opus naumachiæ), the water supply for the naumachia of Augustus was specially constructed, with the surplus used to water neighbouring gardens in the Trans Tiberim. This was the Aqua Alsietina aqueduct, remains of which have been found on the slopes of Janiculum (the "8th hill of Rome") below the monastery of San Cosimato. There are several theories as to the precise location of the site; the latest of which places it between Via Aurelia in the north and the church of San Francesco a Ripa in the southeast, in the loop of the Tiber. The republican viaduct discovered in the Via Aurelia near San Crisogono may also have served as a conduit for the basin.

The basin did not last very long. During the reign of Augustus it was partly replaced (Suetonius, Augustus, 43, 1) by the nemus Cæsarum (sacred forest of the Caesars), later renamed "forest of Gaius and Lucius" for the grandsons of Augustus (Dion Cassius, 66, 25, 3). This vast area was probably built upon by the end of the 1st century.

== Naumachiae in amphitheatres ==
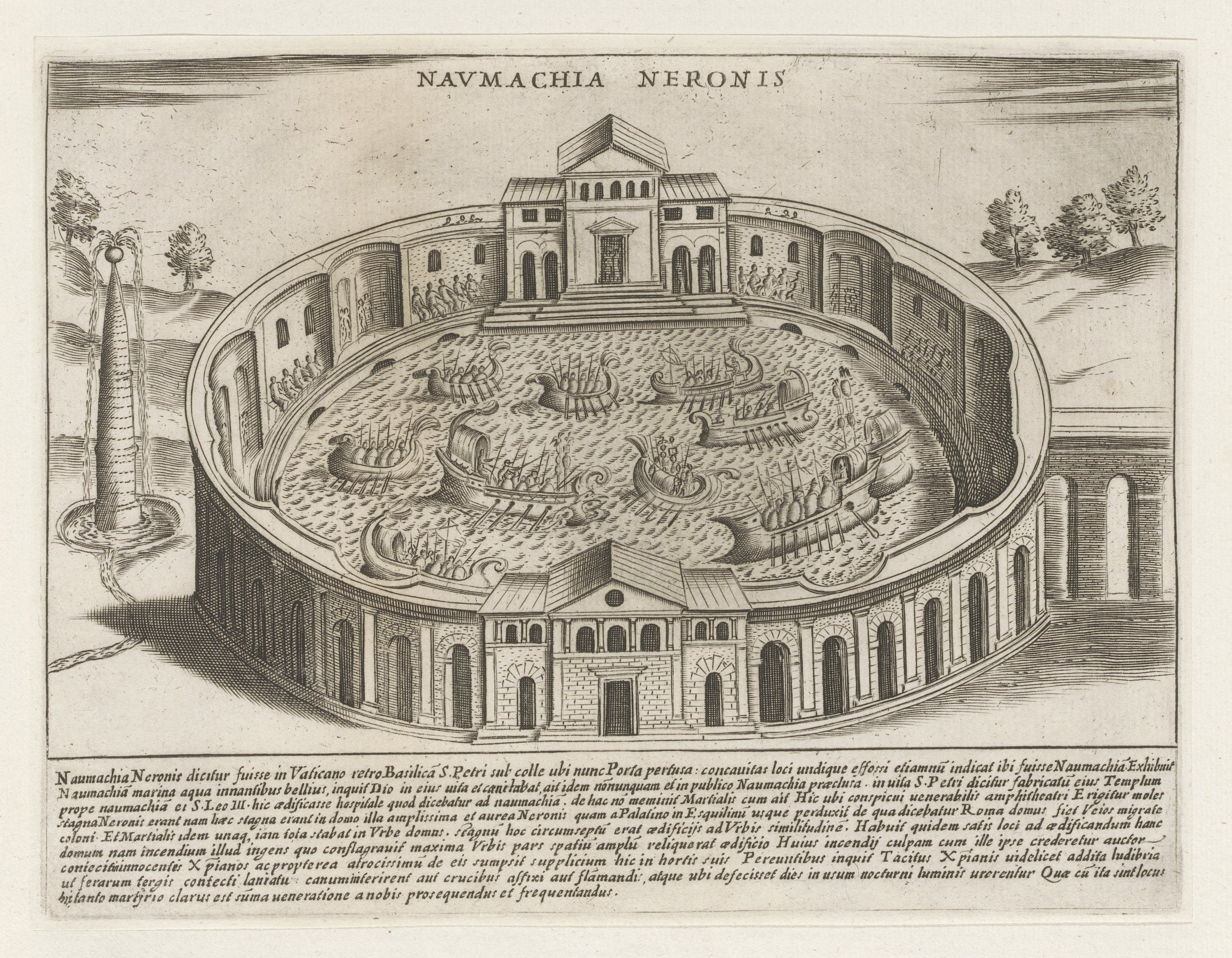
Naumachia Neronis by Giacomo Lauro

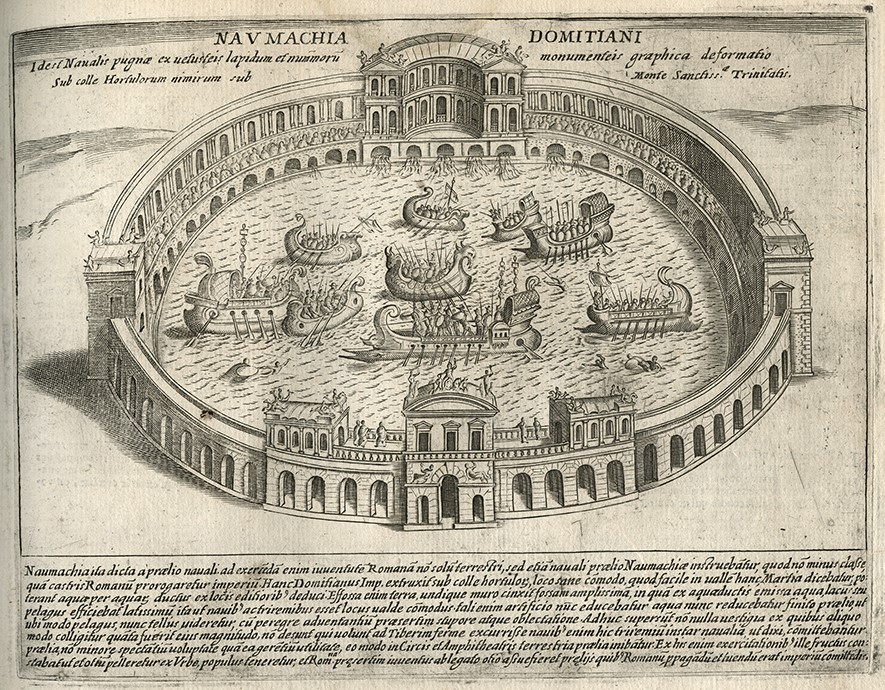
Naumachia Domitiani by Giacomo Lauro, 1625

A new development occurred during the reign of Nero: a naumachia in an amphitheatre. Suetonius (Nero, XII, 1) and Dio Cassius (Roman History, LXI, 9, 5) speak of such a spectacle in 57 AD in a wooden amphitheatre inaugurated by the last of the Julio-Claudian dynasty. Nothing is known of the site other than that it was built on the Campus Martius. Nero presented another naumachia in 64 AD. This was preceded by hunts and followed by gladiatorial combat and a great banquet (Dio Cassius, LXII, 15, 1). It is unknown what form these games took. It was probably the same wooden amphitheatre, given that there is no mention of its destruction before the Great Fire of Rome which happened shortly afterwards.

For the inauguration of the Colosseum in 80 AD, Titus gave two naumachiae, one in the Augustinian basin, again using several thousand men, and the other in the new amphitheatre (Dio Cassius, LXVI, 25, 1–4). According to Suetonius (Domitian, IV, 6–7), Domitian organised a naumachia inside the Colosseum, undoubtedly circa 85 AD, and another one in the year 89 AD in a new basin dug beyond the Tiber; with the stone removed serving to repair the Circus Maximus, which had burnt on two sides. It was probably in the time between these two naumachia that Domitian completed the network of rooms underneath the Colosseum that are visible today, at the same time precluding such spectacles in the arena.

The arena at the Colosseum only measured 79.35 × 47.20 meters, far removed from the dimensions of the Augustinian basin. A naumachia in the Colosseum could therefore not have been as grand as the previous ones. One can imagine a confrontation between the crews of several reproductions of warships, potentially life-size or reasonably close to it, but actual maneuvers or even floating seems doubtful. It is known that stage-props were used to represent ships, sometimes with mechanisms to simulate shipwrecks, both on stage and in the arena (Tacitus, Annales, XIV, 6, 1; Dio Cassius LXI, 12,2).

== Water in the amphitheatres ==
The use of enough water to float vessels in amphitheatres raises technical questions. Amphitheatres were not exclusively used for naumachiae; they would have been filled and drained rapidly enough for use in gladiatorial combats and other spectacles. The rapid transition between water shows and earth-based shows seems to have been one of the great attractions. Dio Cassius underscores this as it relates to Nero's naumachia (LXI, 9, 5); Martial does as well speaking of Titus' naumachia in the Colosseum (Book of Spectacles, XXIV). The only surviving written sources offer no descriptions of the mechanisms or engineering involved. Archaeology provides no clues: the basement of the Colosseum has since been modified. Only two provincial amphitheatres, those at Verona and Mérida, Spain, provide any technical evidence.

The central pit of the Verona amphitheatre was deeper than the rooms normally found underneath the arena, and served as a basin. It was connected to two axial conduits. One, circulating under the West gallery of the arena, was not connected to the drainage system and had to be connected to an aqueduct in order to fill the basin. The East conduit was deeper and designed to drain water into the Adige River. The basin at the Mérida amphitheatre, at only 1.5 meters, was shallower than that at Verona. Because it is so shallow—less than the height of a standing man—it cannot be confused with an underground service room. This basin was equipped with access stairs and covered with material similar to that used for swimming pools and Roman baths. It was also served by two conduits, the western one of which connected to the nearby San Lazaro aqueduct.

The dimensions of these basins rule out any but the most basic of naumachiae: the one at Mérida measures a mere 18.5 × 3.7 meters. Only the most modest of water spectacles could have taken place here. This leads one to conclude that, even assuming that the Colosseum had a similar basin before construction of the hypogeum (underground complex), naumachiae would have been performed on only a shallow layer of water covering the surface of the arena, the minimum required to float the ships.

== Decline of Roman naumachiae ==
The introduction of new technologies initially led to an increased number of naumachiae. The first three naumachiae were spaced about 50 years apart; the following six, most of which took place in amphitheatres, occurred in a space of 30 years. Less costly in material and human terms, they could afford to be staged more frequently. Less grandiose, they became a feature of the games, but could not be considered exceptional. The iconography bears witness to this. Of some twenty representations of a naumachia in Roman art, nearly all are of the Fourth Style, of the time of Nero and the Flavian dynasty.

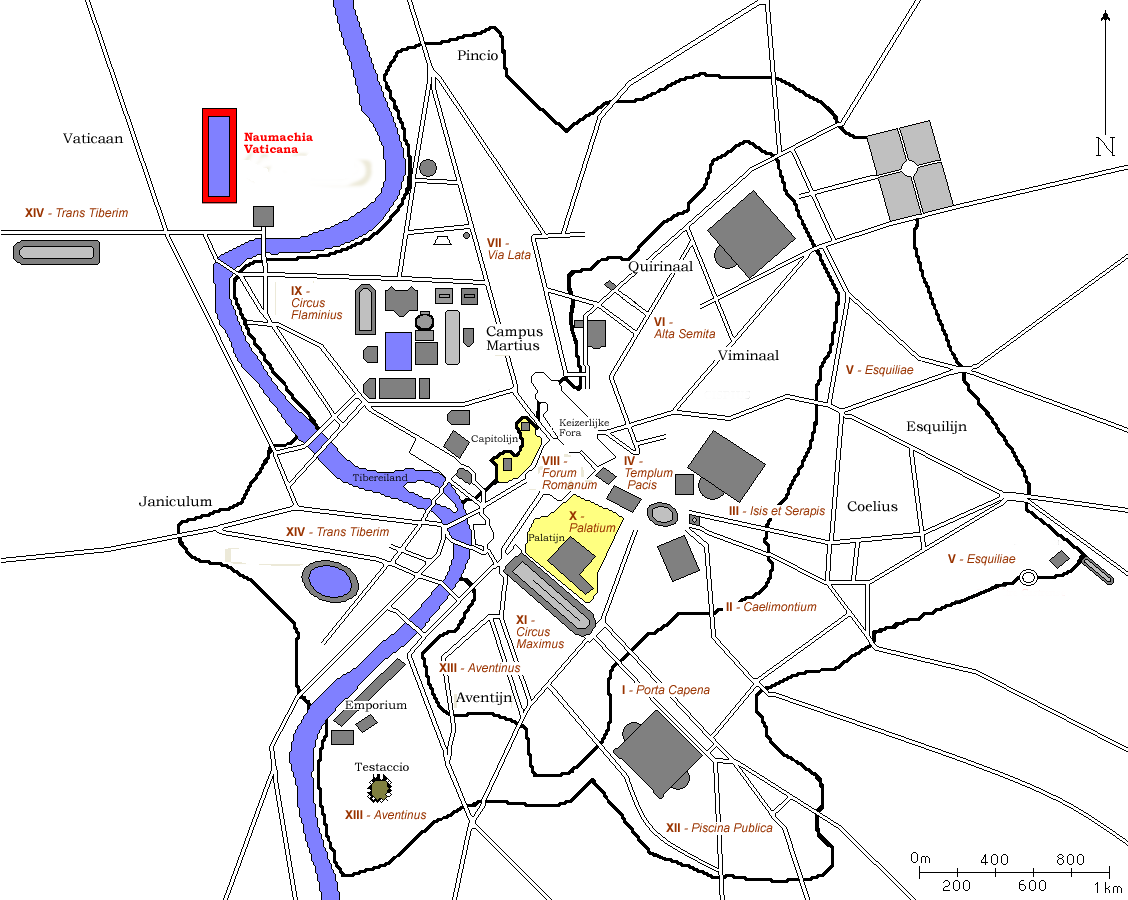
Naumachia Vaticana on a map of ancient Rome around 300 AD

After the Flavian period, naumachiae disappear from the texts almost completely. Apart from a mention in the Augustan History, a late source of limited reliability, only the town records (fastia) of Ostia tells us that in 109 Trajan inaugurated a naumachia basin. This site was discovered in the 18th century on the grounds of the Vatican City, northwest of the Castel Sant'Angelos. It is now referred to as the Naumachia Vaticana, with some sources erroneously calling it the Circus of Hadrian due to the similarities of its shape to that of other excavated circuses, along with the site's proximity to the Mausoleum of Hadrian. Subsequent digs have revealed the complete site plan. It had bleachers (tiered stands for spectators) and the surface was about one sixth the size of the Augustan naumachia. In the absence of any texts, it has to be assumed that it was only used at the time of Trajan.

Nevertheless, if late Roman Empire sources and persistence into the Middle Ages in terms of the toponymy of naumachia and dalmachia at the site are taken into consideration, it still existed into the 5th century. Moreover, the presence of bleachers on its perimeter is a strong indicator of regular shows. According to the Ostia municipal records, the inauguration involved 127 pairs of gladiators; leading one to believe that as in the amphitheatre, the restrictive space at Trajan's basin was not conducive to large combats involving many untrained prisoners, or would have required over-simplification of naval combats, leading to a preference for single combat. In this form, and with a dedicated site, naumachiae could easily have continued (though likely at a reducing frequency) for several centuries without mention in sources, as they would not have been particularly worthy of mention: they simply lost their grandeur and impressive character.

In the provinces, the influence of Roman naumachiae is easily discernible, but limited and reduced to local and innocuous naval games and re-enactments. A competition which went under the name of naumaciva was part of the Panathenaic Games between the Athenian Ephebos from the Flavian period onward. It replaced the regattas which had taken place at these games earlier. If Ausonius is to be believed, (Moselle, 200–2,29), a naumachia was held on the Moselle River between local youth.

== Post-Roman naumachiae ==
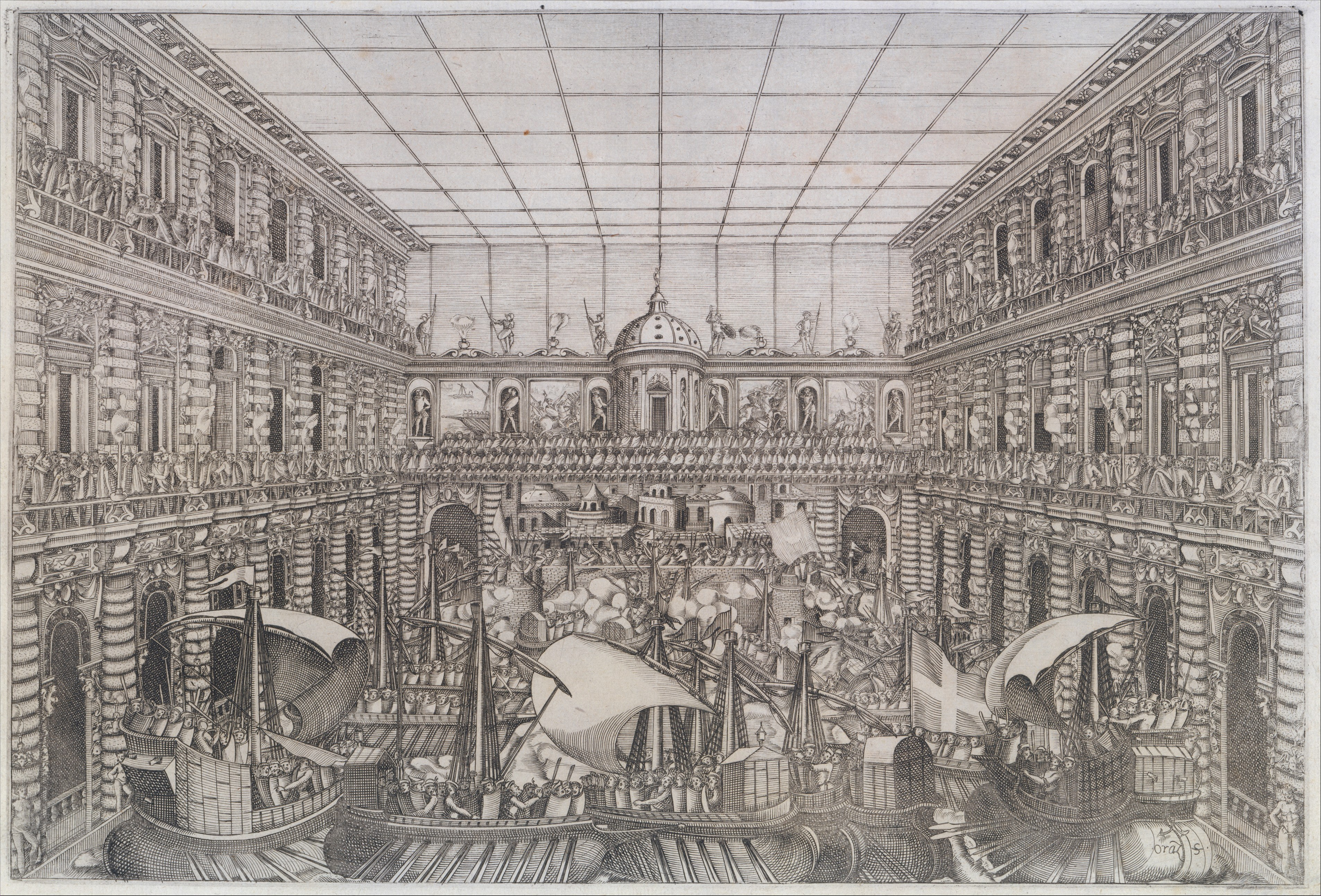
1589 Wedding at the Palazzo Pitti

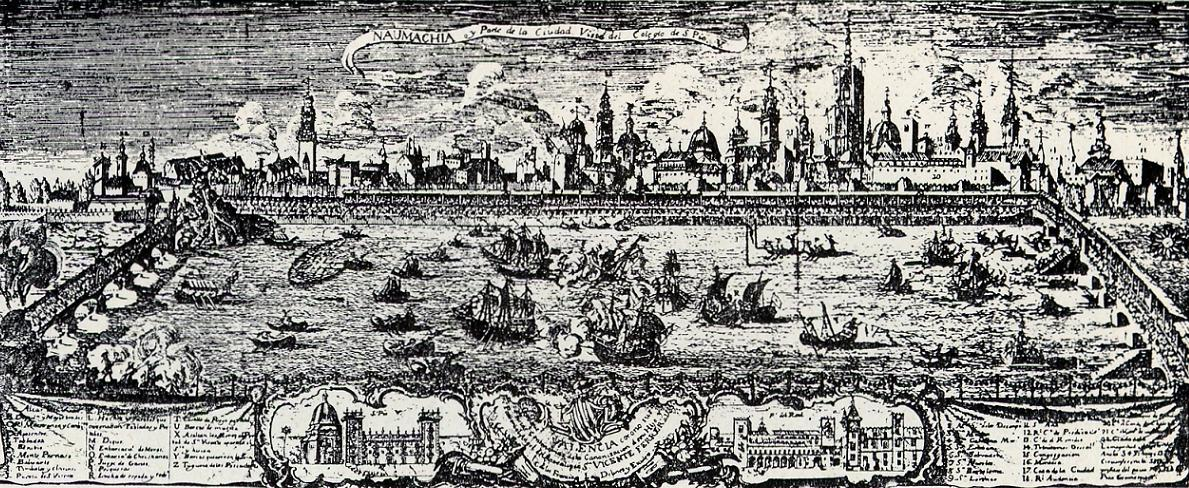
A naumachia held in Valencia in 1755

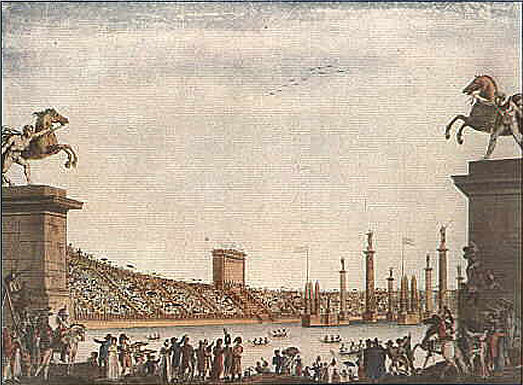
A modern naumachia held in the Arena Civica in Milan in 1807

A naumachia was performed for Henry II of France in Rouen in 1550.

A naumachia was part of the festivities of Wedding of Grand Duke Ferdinando I de' Medici and Christina of Lorraine held in the courtyard of the Palazzo Pitti in Florence in 1589. There is an etching of the event that was part of an album created by Orazio Scarabelli to document the wedding festivities.

A naumachia was held in Valencia between the Bridges of the Turia river, on the occasion of the centenary of the canonization of Saint Vincent Ferrer in 1755. Another was held in Milan for Napoleon in 1807.

Parc Monceau in Paris features a naumachia water feature, surrounded by a colonnade. In 18th and 19th century England, several parks featured mock naval battles with model ships, which were also referred to as naumachia. Peasholm Park in Scarborough, England, still stages such an event. Smaller, theatre-based aqua dramas were also popular.

New York artist Duke Riley staged a naumachia in 2009 at the Queens Museum of Art.

=== In Scotland and England ===
In Scotland naumachiae were staged on a loch in Holyrood park in 1562 for the wedding of Lord Fleming and on the Water of Leith in 1581 for the wedding of James Stewart, 2nd Earl of Moray and Elizabeth Stewart.

A Naumachia was staged on the Thames at the wedding of Princess Elizabeth and Frederick V of the Palatinate in February 1613. In June 1613 Anne of Denmark visited Bristol. A seat was built for her at Canon's Marsh near the Bristol Cathedral, where on 7 June she watched a staged battle at the confluence of the Avon and Frome rivers, fought between an English ship and two Turkish galleys. After the victory, some Turkish captives (played by actors) were presented to her and she laughed at this, saying both the actors' costumes and their "countenances" were like the Turks. The entertainment at Bristol was described in verse by Robert Naile, who mentions the Turks were played by sailors, "worthy brutes, who oft have seen their habit, form and guise". They were made to kneel before Anne of Denmark and beg for mercy as the final act of the pageant.

In Georgian-era Britain, Naumachia were staged in private parks and gardens, consciously recreating them based on the Roman pattern, though on a smaller scale. Francis Dashwood, 11th Baron le Despencer constructed an artificial lake at West Wycombe in the shape of a swan, and staged several Naumachia on the lake with small ships; he also ordered a construction of a fort on the lake's edge to participate in the mock battles himself.

== See also ==
- Naval warfare
- Water jousting
- Spectacles in ancient Rome
