= Henri Jordan =

German classical scholar (1833–1886)

Henri Jordan (30 September 1833, Berlin – 10 November 1886, Königsberg) was a German classical scholar who specialized in Roman archaeological topography. He was a son-in-law to historian Johann Gustav Droysen.

He attended Joachimsthalsches Gymnasium in Berlin under the directorship of August Meineke, then studied from 1852 to 1856 at the universities of Berlin (with Moritz Haupt) and Bonn. In 1861 he obtained his habilitation, and during the same year, undertook a study trip to Rome. In 1867 he was appointed professor of classical philology at the University of Königsberg.

He was part of a group of distinguished late 19th-century scholars of the Roman Forum that included Christian Hülsen and Rodolfo Lanciani. He is most famous for his two-volume study of Roman topography, Topographie der Stadt Rom im Alterthum. This important work includes a critical edition of the regionary catalogues of ancient Rome, the Notitia and the Curiosum. He was the author of significant writings on ancient Roman religion and also made contributions examining the history of the Latin language (1879).

== Published works ==
1. Quaestionum Catonianarum capita duo. dissertation, (Berlin 1856).
2. M. Catonis praeter librum de re rustica quae extant, (Leipzig 1860).
3. Topographie der Stadt Rom im Altertum, (Berlin 1870-85, 2 volumes).
4. Kritische Beiträge zur Geschichte der lateinischen Sprache, (Berlin 1879).
5. 1886. Der Tempel der Vesta und das Haus der Vestalinnen. Weidmann.

He edited Ludwig Preller's Römische Mythologie (3rd edition, 2 volumes, 1881), and with Franz Eyssenhardt, published an edition of Scriptores historiae Augustae ab Hadriano ad Numerianum (1864).
