= Franz Eyssenhardt =

German classical philologist (1838–1901)

- Born: 6 March 1838; Berlin, Kingdom of Prussia
- Died: 30 November 1901 (aged 63); Hamburg, Kingdom of Prussia, German Empire

Academic work
- Discipline: Classical philology

Franz Eyssenhardt (6 March 1838 – 30 November 1901) was a German classical philologist born in Berlin.

He studied philology in Berlin, and subsequently became an instructor at the Werderscher gymnasium. In 1868-69 he performed research in Italy, and in 1876 was appointed professor at the Johanneum in Hamburg. From 1882 to 1900 he was director of the Hamburg city library.

Eyssenhardt was author of editions of Martianus Capella, Phaedrus, Macrobius, Apuleius and Ammianus Marcellinus. Another noted work of his was an 1886 biography of historian Barthold Georg Niebuhr (1776-1831).

== Selected publications ==
- Scriptores Historiae Augustae ab Hadriano ad Numerianum, Berlin 1864; edited with Henri Jordan.
- Martianus Capella, Leipzig 1866.
- Phaedri fabulae, Berlin 1867.
- Macrobius, Leipzig 1868.
- Apuleii metamorphoseon libri XI, Berlin 1869.
- Ammiani Marcellini rerum gestarum libri qui supersunt, Berlin 1871.

He was the author of a dozen articles in the Allgemeine Deutsche Biographie.
