= Christian Hülsen =

German architectural historian

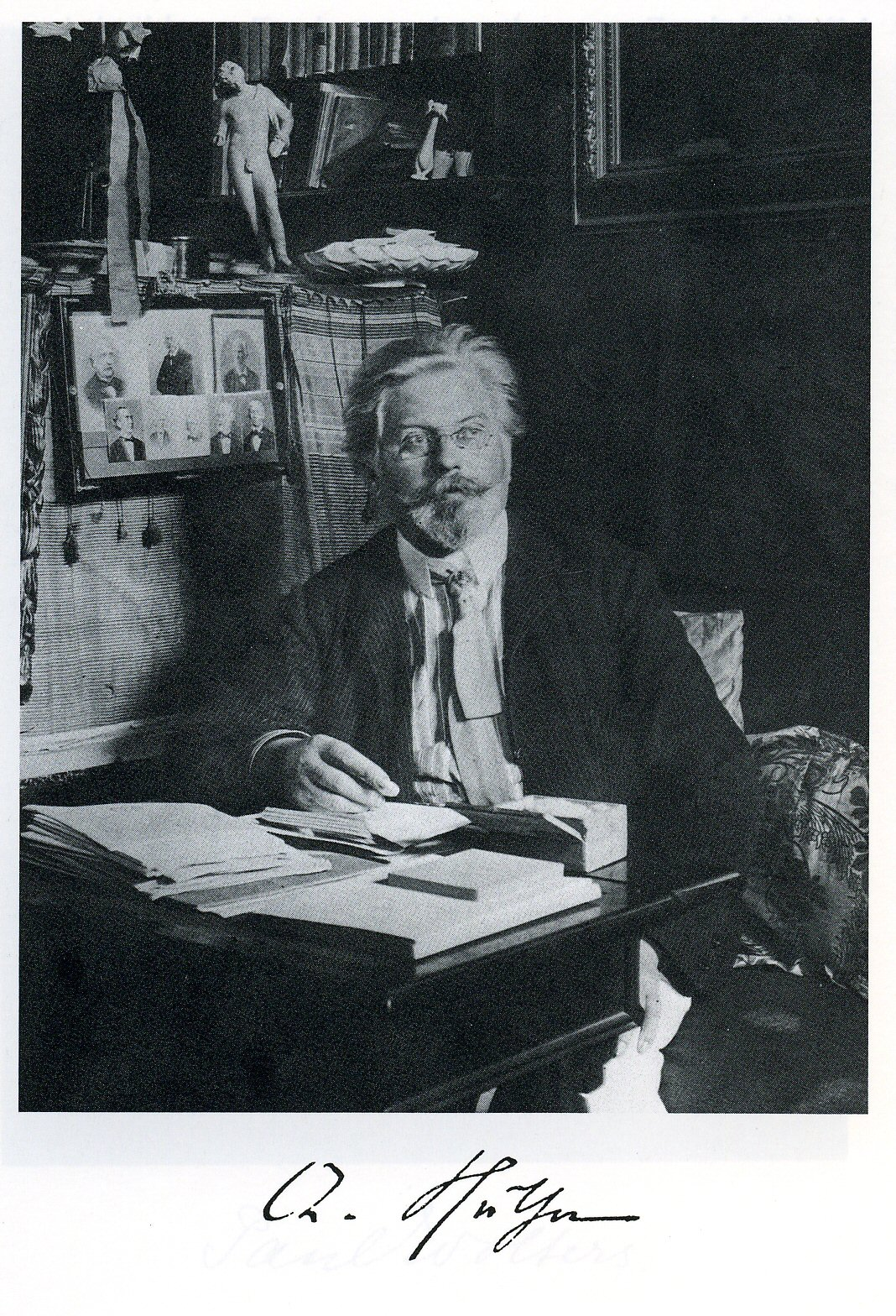
Christian Hülsen.

Christian Karl Friedrich Hülsen (born in Charlottenburg, 29 November 1858; died in Florence, Italy, on 19 January 1935) was a German architectural historian of the classical era who later changed to studying the Middle Ages and the Renaissance.

== Biography ==
Hülsen was born in Berlin. He studied classical philology, ancient history and archaeology with Ernst Curtius, Johann Gustav Droysen (1808-1884), Emil Hübner (1834-1901), Johannes Vahlen (1830-1911), and Theodor Mommsen (1817-1903). His dissertation, on Ovid, was directed by Mommsen and Hübner. Through Mommsen, he was awarded a stipend from the DAI (Deutsches Archäologisches Institut) to travel to Rome where he assisted in the compilation of the Corpus Inscriptionum Latinarum for the city of Rome. In 1904 he published his Das Forum Romanum, an important and widely translated work on the Roman Forum. As a topographical scholar he gained equal fame with his volume on Roman topography, volume three of Topographie der Stadt Rom in Altertum, appearing in 1907. Despite these accomplishments and his service as second secretary to the DAI in Rome (1887-1909) he was twice denied the appointment of first secretary.

In disillusionment, Hülsen left the institute to live in Florence, where he changed focus to medieval and renaissance art. In Florence he published studies on the historic drawings of Rome by Maarten van Heemskerck, Giuliano da Sangallo, Giovanni Antonio Dosio and other artists. In 1927 his study on the churches of medieval Rome and published Le Chiese di Roma nel Medio Evo. Like his other books in many disparate fields, it represented significant original scholarship. He remained in Florence for the remainder of his life except for five years as professor at the University of Heidelberg. He was the recipient of honorary degrees from Oxford, Erlangen, and New York. Hülsen died in Florence.

== Works ==
1. Varronianae doctrinae quaenam in Ovidii fastis vestigia extent. Berlin: Goetsch und Mann, 1880 (dissertation).
2. with Henri Jordan: Topographie der Stadt Rom im Alterthum. Volume I, part 3. Berlin: Weidmannsche Buchhandlung, 1907.
3. Le chiese di Roma nel medio evo, cataloghi ed appunti. Florence: L.S. Olschki, 1927; the bulk of it is online at LacusCurtius. Reprint Hildesheim: Olms, 1975, ISBN 3-487-05610-0.
4. with Heinrich Kiepert: Formae Urbis Romae antiquae. 1896, (English ed., The Forum and the Palatine. New York: A. Bruderhausen, 1909).
5. Das Forum Romanum 1904; online, complete in Italian and partial in English, at LacusCurtius
6. Die Skizzenbücher des Marten van Heemskerck. Berlin: J. Bard, 1912-1916.
7. Römische Antikengärten des XVI. Jahrhunderts, 1917.
8. edited: Das Skizzenbuch des Giovannantonio Dosio im Staatlichen Kupferstichkabinett zu Berlin. Berlin: H. Keller, 1933.
9. Le monument païen et la topographie du lieu. In: Sainte Marie Antique. Rome: M. Bretschneider, 1911, pp. 61–70.
10. ed., with Ernst Robert Fiechter: Römische Gebälke. Toebelmann-Stiftung der Heidelberger Akademie der Wissenschaften. Heidelberg: C. Winter, 1923.
