= Jérôme Carcopino =

French historian and author (1881–1970)

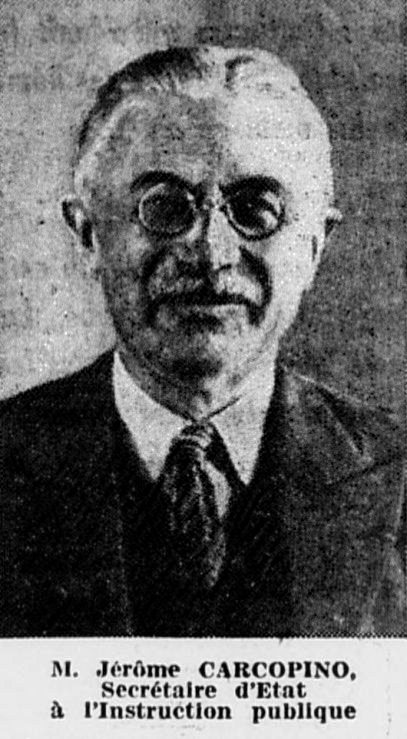
- Carcopino in 1941

Secretary of State for Public Instruction and Youth
- In office 25 February 1941 – 18 April 1942
- Prime Minister: Philippe Pétain
- Preceded by: Jacques Chevalier
- Succeeded by: Abel Bonnard

Personal details
- Born: Jérôme Ernest Joseph Carcopino; 27 July 1881 Verneuil-sur-Avre, France
- Died: 17 March 1970 Paris, France
- Occupation: Historian

Jérôme Ernest Joseph Carcopino (27 June 1881 – 17 March 1970) was a French historian renowned for his expertise in ancient Rome. Born in Verneuil-sur-Avre (Eure), he held various high-ranking civil service positions and also played a role in French political life. He died in Paris’s 7th arrondissement. He was the fifteenth member elected to occupy seat 3 of the Académie française, in 1955.

== Biography ==
Carcopino was born at Verneuil-sur-Avre, Eure, son of a doctor from a Corsican family related to Bonaparte, and educated at the École Normale Supérieure where he specialised in history. From 1904 to 1907 he was a member of the French School in Rome. In 1912 he was a professor of history in Le Havre. In 1912 he became a lecturer at the University of Algiers and inspector of antiquities in Algeria until 1920. His career was interrupted by World War I when he served in the Dardanelles. He became a professor at the Sorbonne in 1920 until 1937 when he became Director of the French School in Rome. He was a member of many archaeological and historical institutes in Europe.

During the Nazi Occupation of France during the Second World War, Carcopino was appointed first as the Director of the École normale supérieure, and later the Minister of National Education and Youth under Pétain's Vichy regime. He held the ministerial role from 25 February 1941 to 18 April 1942. In this role, Carcopino was an eager supporter of the new regime, overseeing the promulgation of a number of antisemitic legal decrees excluding Jewish students and teachers from educational institutions. Carcopino was removed from his position after the war due to his complicity in the Vichy regime, and was interned at Fresnes Prison from August 1944 until February 1945, before being legally rehabilitated in 1947 for "services rendered to the resistance". Carcopino's students appear to have subsequently made efforts to launder his reputation in academia, and attention has also been drawn to the fact that he did protect some individual Jewish scholars, such as Marc Bloch.

== Bibliography ==
- Jérôme Carcopino (1909). Histoire de l'ostracisme athénien. Mélanges d'histoire ancienne; 25. F. Alcan.
- —— (1919). Virgile et les origines d'Ostie. E. de Boccard.
- —— (1919). La loi de Hiéron et les Romains. E. de Boccard.
- —— (1924). Points de vue sur l'ìmpérialisme romain.
- —— (1928). Autour des Gracques, études critiques.
- —— (1940). La vie Quotidienne à Rome à l'Apogée de l'Empire. (English: Daily Life in Ancient Rome: The People and the City at the Height of the Empire. Ed. Henry T. Rowell. Trans. Emily Overend Lorimer. Yale University Press. ISBN 0-300-00031-6.)
- —— (1951). Cicero: The Secrets of His Correspondence. Routledge & Kegan Paul Ltd.
- —— (1958). Passion et politique chez les Césars. Hachette.
- —— (1961). Les Etapes de l'impérialisme romain.
