= Spina di Borgo =

Former borgo of Rome

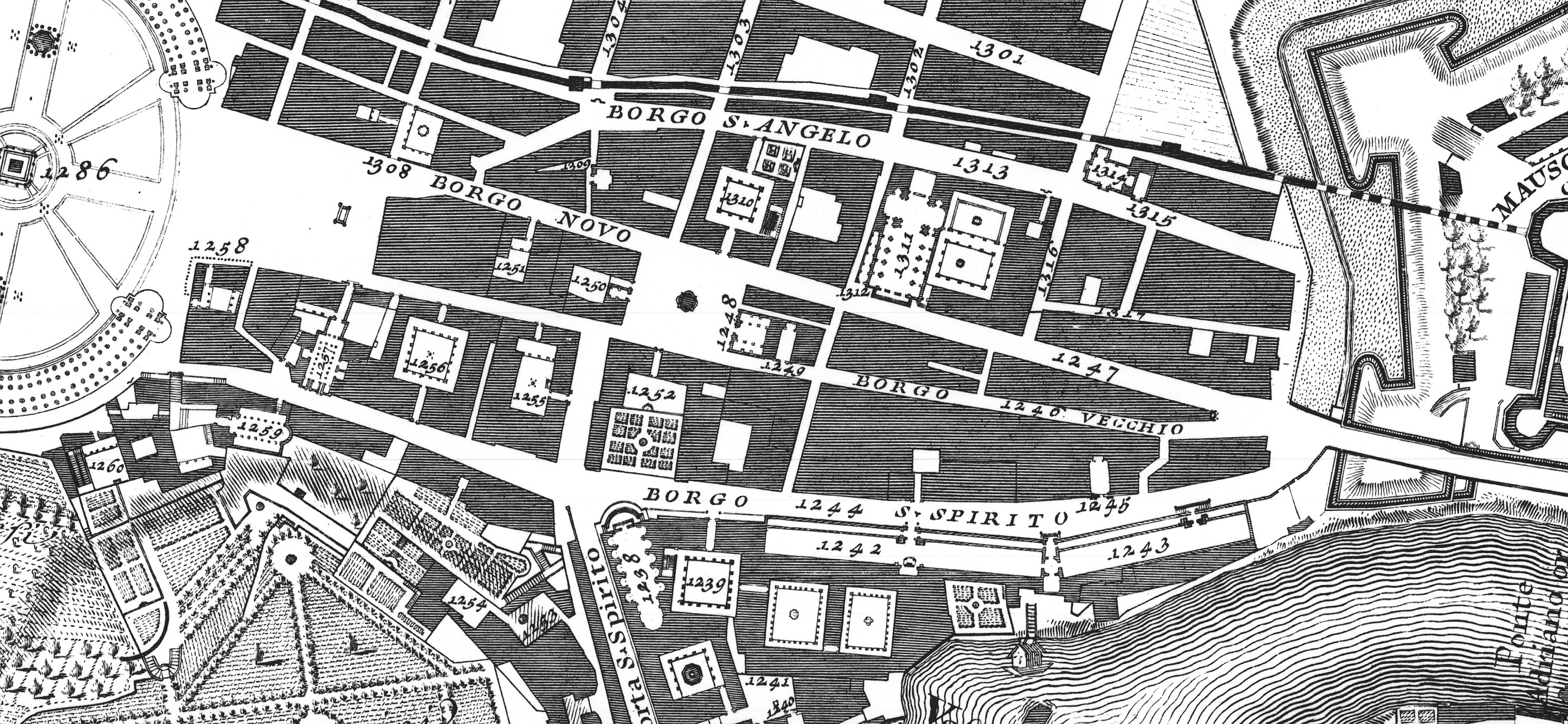
Spina di Borgo in the map of Giambattista Nolli published in 1748

Spina di Borgo was a neighbourhood in Roma which was located between Castel Sant'Angelo and St. Peter's Square.

== History ==
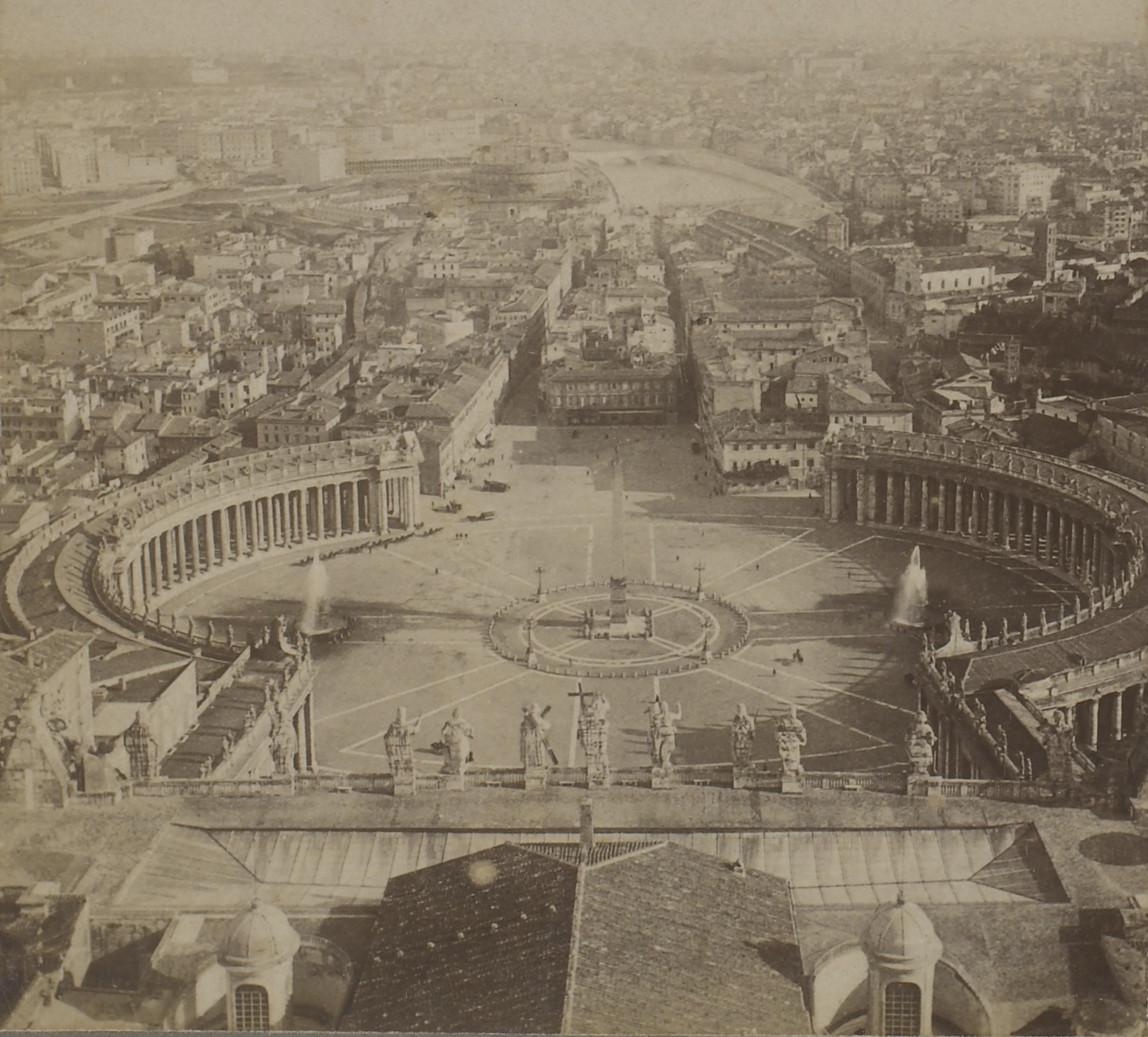
Panorama from St. Peter's Basilica, 1901. Spina di Borgo is visible.

Scossacavalli Square, with the former Maderno fountain and the Church of St. Jacob in the background

Following the construction of the Via Alessandrina, commissioned by Pope Alexander VI in preparation for the Jubilee of 1500, the urban fabric of the Borgo district was reorganized. In subsequent centuries, the thoroughfare became known to the Roman population as Borgo Nuovo. Thereafter, the buildings of the Borgo were bounded by two converging streets forming a wedge-shaped layout: Borgo Nuovo to the north and Borgo Vecchio to the south. This intervention gave rise to an elongated triangular urban layout, with its apex oriented toward Castel Sant'Angelo. Owing to its resemblance to the "spina", the central dividing barrier of an ancient Roman circus, the area became known as the Spina di Borgo.

Running along Borgo Nuovo is, even today, Palazzo Torlonia. When Queen Christina of Sweden famously abdicated her throne, converted to Catholicism, and arrived in Rome in December 1655, she was officially hosted in the palace by Cardinal Giuseppe Renato Imperiali.

In 1692, Carlo Fontana developed the first comprehensive proposal to remove the Spina. The new colonnades magnificently framed the piazza, but visitors approaching from Castel Sant'Angelo still encountered a maze of narrow medieval streets that obscured the basilica until the final moment. Fontana regarded this as a serious urban and ceremonial flaw. In his monumental publication Il Tempio Vaticano (published in 1694, though the project is often dated to 1692), he proposed to demolish much of the Spina as far as Piazza Scossacavalli; setting Gian Lorenzo Bernini's unrealized "third arm" of the colonnade farther back; creating a broader approach leading up to St. Peter's. He described the Spina as an unsightly accumulation of houses that detracted from the monumentality of the basilica. The proposal failed largely because of its enormous projected cost and the extensive property expropriations it would have required.

Cosimo Morelli revived the idea during the pontificate of Pope Pius VI. He envisioned: the complete demolition of the Spina; a grand axial avenue extending from Castel Sant'Angelo toward St. Peter's; the project integrated with new plans for the Vatican sacristy and canonical buildings. His drawings explicitly emphasize that removing the wedge of buildings would reveal an uninterrupted view of the basilica from the bridge. In many respects, the composition anticipates Via della Conciliazione by roughly 160 years. Like Fontana's proposal, however, it was never executed, primarily because of financial constraints. Later, during the French occupation of Rome, substantial funds were reportedly earmarked for a similar scheme, but work never began.

The start of its demolition was initiated by the project of urban theorists Marcello Piacentini and Attilio Spaccarelli, who aimed to create a monumental and more walkable alternative to the Spina. The project was supported by Benito Mussolini and the National Fascist Party, who announced to the Italian senate, on 18 March 1932, the plan to destroy the neighbourhood. Plans to study the way the project should have unfolded and if it was even possible begun in 1935. At 09:00 AM of 29 October 1936, Mussolini, symbolically initiated its destruction by photographing himself on top of a building with a pickaxe. The year after, on 8 October 1937, the view had been clear, making both Castel Sant'Angelo and St. Peter's square visible.

== Visual records of the former borgo ==
In an interview, Alberto Sordi explained the visual effect caused by the architecture of the Spina before its demolition:

I was four years old when I first saw St. Peter's, and it was during the Jubilee of 1925. I was with my father; we had come from Trastevere, where I had been born on Via San Cosimato and where I lived with my family. We made our way through the narrow lanes of Borgo Pio (sic) a jumble of little houses, small squares, and winding streets, most of which were later demolished. Then, as we passed the last wall of a house, it opened like a curtain, and before me appeared that immense square. Bernini's colonnade, the dome. It was a dramatic revelation that left me speechless. Above all, what I remember most about that Jubilee is that overwhelming sense of surprise.

— Alberto Sordi in his interview with Roberto Rotondo per 30 Giorni, N. 1, 2000

== Demolished buildings ==
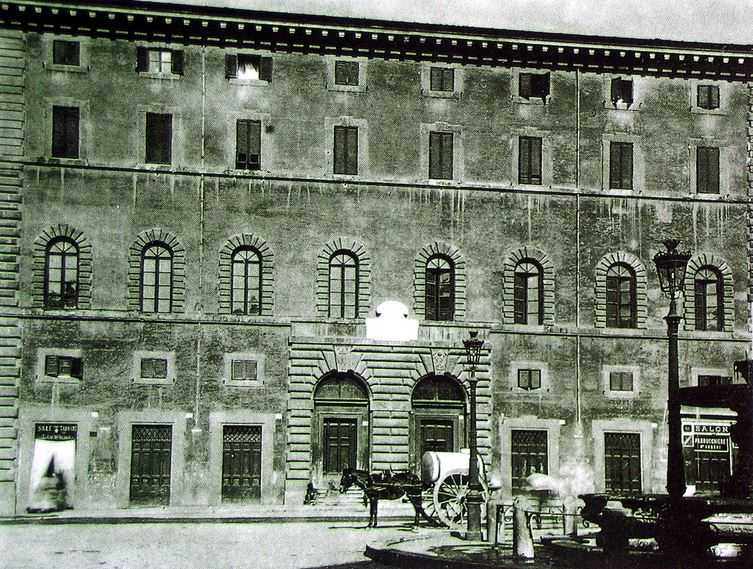
Convertendi Palace (1920)

- House of Febo Brigotti (rebuilt)
- Church of St. Jacob and Scossacavalli
- Oratorio di San Sebastiano a Scossacavalli
- Church of San Lorenzo in Piscibus (partly demolished)
- St. Carl Hospital (the first military hospital in Rome)
- Palazzo Alicorni(rebuilt)
- Palazzo Caprini
- Palazzo Cesi-Armellini (partly demolished)
- Palazzo dei Convertendi (rebuilt)
- Palazzo del Governatore di Borgo
- Palazzo Jacopo di Bartolomeo da Brescia (rebuilt)
- Palazzi Poletti
- Palazzo Rusticucci-Accoramboni (rebuilt)
- Palazzo Sauve (demolished)

== Bibliography ==
- La spina. Dall'agro vaticano a via della Conciliazione. Architettura, Urbanistica, Ambiente. Roma: Gangemi. 2016. ISBN 978-88-492-3320-9.
