= Attilio Spaccarelli =

Italian architect

- Born: 17 February 1890; Rome, Kingdom of Italy
- Died: 12 June 1976 (aged 86); Rome, Italy
- Education: St. Michael Institute in Rome
- Occupation: Architect
- Spouse: Giselda Bona
- Children: Giorgio, Arnaldo, and Marcello
- Parent(s): Augusto Spaccarelli, Agnese Vignetti

Attilio Spaccarelli (17 February 1890 – 12 June 1976) was an Italian architect.

== Biography ==
He was born in Rome on 17 February 1890. His parents were Augusto Spaccarelli, who was a sculptor, and Agnese Vignetti. His father died early on in his life, and he was sent to the St. Michael Institute in Rome. In 1912, he managed to secure the title of professor in architectural design.

He served the Royal Italian Army during World War I as an infantry lieutenant assigned to the technical services of the Engineers and Artillery. When he returned from the war, he once again continued his profession as a professor alongside Arnaldo Foschini. In 1912, he married Giselda Bona and had three children: Giorgio, Arnaldo, and Marcello.

Between 1917 and 1920, Attilio Spaccarelli designed a number of residential buildings, most of which have since been demolished. These included the Villino Astaldi in Rome's Pinciano district, designed in collaboration with Arnaldo Foschini, Adolfo Sebastiani, and Carlo Giuliani. During the same period, Spaccarelli, Foschini, and Giuliani also designed a cinema on Via Volturno for Giulio and Ernesto Querini. Together with Foschini, he additionally designed the Supercinema on Via del Viminale and directed the restoration of Palazzo Borromeo on Via Flaminia, later used as the seat of the Italian Embassy to the Holy See, as well as the restoration of the Teatro Sala Umberto. In 1925, again in partnership with Foschini, Spaccarelli won the competition for the extension of Via Marco Minghetti and the subsequent redevelopment of Piazza di Trevi and Piazza del Lavatore in Rome's Trevi district. During this period, he joined the Roman Federation of Architects, led by Ulisse Stacchini, and, together with Foschini and Alberto Calza Bini, became one of the leading members of the action committee headed by Marcello Piacentini. On 24 March 1928, Spaccarelli was formally admitted to the Register of Architects of Rome.

In 1934, on commission from the Governorship of Rome, Spaccarelli prepared a project for the isolation of Castel Sant'Angelo. The scheme called for the restoration of the fortress's sixteenth-century appearance through the demolition of numerous buildings regarded as "more or less parasitic," the reopening of the moat, which had been filled in toward the end of the nineteenth century, and the creation of a park between the castle's two defensive walls. In the same year, Spaccarelli also produced a proposal for a new visual approach to St. Peter's Square. Unlike the more radical scheme put forward by Marcello Piacentini, which enjoyed greater support in the contemporary press, Spaccarelli's design envisaged demolishing only selected sections of the Spina di Borgo to enlarge Piazza Rusticucci, while seeking to preserve what he described as the "material, spiritual, and historical unity" of the Borgo district. In 1935, responsibility for preparing the final design was entrusted jointly to Spaccarelli and Piacentini, although in practice Piacentini was the principal architect of the urban interventions that led to the construction of Via della Conciliazione.

In 1939, Spaccarelli was appointed a member of the National Council for Education, Science, and the Arts. In the following years, he served on several commissions responsible for evaluating major public works undertaken in Rome, including the Building Commissions for the city of Rome and the Agro Romano. In 1943, he was elected a member of the Accademia di San Luca. During the 1950s, together with Giuseppe Perugini and Cesare Valle, he oversaw the construction of the INA-Casa housing estate at Acilia-Casal Bernocchi. In the same area, he designed the San Pier Damiani ai Monti di San Paolo church in 1962; the building was completed in 1970.

In 1959, together with Pasquale Carbonara and Fabrizio Bruno, Spaccarelli participated in the competition for the design of the new headquarters of the National Central Library in Rome's Castro Pretorio district. Their proposal was awarded second place behind the design submitted by Massimo Castellazzi, Tullio Dell'Anese, and Annibale Vitellozzi. Spaccarelli's professional collaboration with Bruno continued until the end of his career. Together, they designed the headquarters of the Pontifical Lombard Seminary in Piazza di Santa Maria Maggiore and carried out the restoration of the Monastery of Sant'Egidio in Trastevere, which was later converted into the Museo di Rome. In 1965, during the renovation of the former studio of the painter Mariano Fortuny y Madrazo on Via Flaminia, Spaccarelli and Fabrizio Bruno supervised the relocation of a historic drinking trough dating to the pontificate of Pope Pius IV, reconstructing its original position on the basis of an engraving by Giuseppe Vasi.

He died in Rome on 12 June 1976.
