= Hotel d'Inghilterra =

Hotel in Rome, Italy

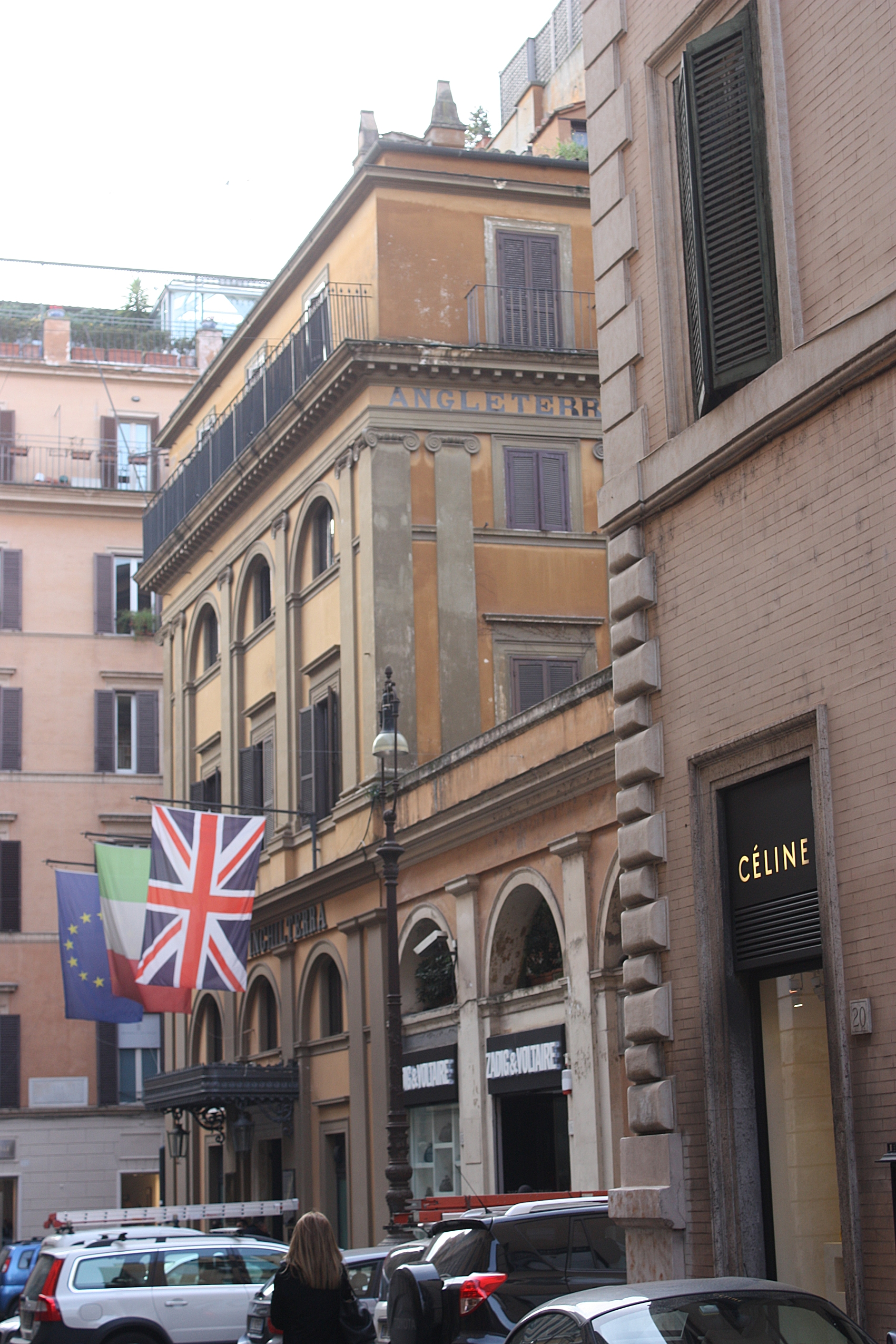
- Interactive map of the Hotel d'Inghilterra area

General information
- Location: Rome, Italy, Via Bocca di Leone, 14, 00187
- Coordinates: 41°54′16.96″N 12°28′42.28″E
- Opened: 1845

Technical details
- Floor count: 7

Design and construction
- Architects: Alessandro Pasini and Tomaso Piantini

Other information
- Number of rooms: 88

Website
- www.starhotelscollezione.com/en/our-hotels/hotel-d-inghilterra-rome/

Hotel d’Inghilterra is a five-star luxury boutique hotel in Rome, Italy. The 88-room hotel has been one of Rome's most fashionable hotels since it opened in 1845.

The hotel is a member of Small Luxury Hotels of the World.

== History and location ==
The building that houses the hotel dates to the mid-sixteenth century when it was used as a residence for visitors of what is now the Palazzo Torlonia, (Note: Not to be confused with the Palazzo Torlonia on Via della Conciliazione) but then the residence of Francesco Nunez Sanchez, located directly across from it on the Via Boccca Di Leone. By the fifteenth century, the local area was renowned for hosting the city’s best hotels and attracted foreign visitors and international communities. It is adjacent to the Via Borgognona, a historic street known for high-end shopping.

In 1845, the Palazzo di Torlonia’s guesthouse was converted into a hotel known, due to its popularity with British visitors, as the Hotel d’Angleterre. Monarchs, movie moguls, and renowned writers stayed here including Lord Byron, John Keats, Mark Twain, Ernest Hemingway, and Elizabeth Taylor.

== Art and architecture ==
The design of the Hotel d’Inghilterra was inspired by the Italian architects Alessandro Pasini and Tomaso Piantini and the furnishings and fittings were inspired by designer Roberto Terrinoni both working under the art direction of Countess Cristina Gotti Lega. The first renovations date to 2008 and affected the entire fourth floor, reducing the 21 rooms to 13, larger rooms, redecorated with chandeliers of hand-blown Murano glass, and modern fabrics and amenities. Since then, the other floors have been similarly renovated.

== Bibliography ==
- Valeriani, Roberto (2016). "Palazzo Torlonia – De Luca Editori d'Arte" (in Italian).
