= Palazzo Cesi-Armellini =

Coordinates: 41°54′6.74″N 12°27′35.75″E

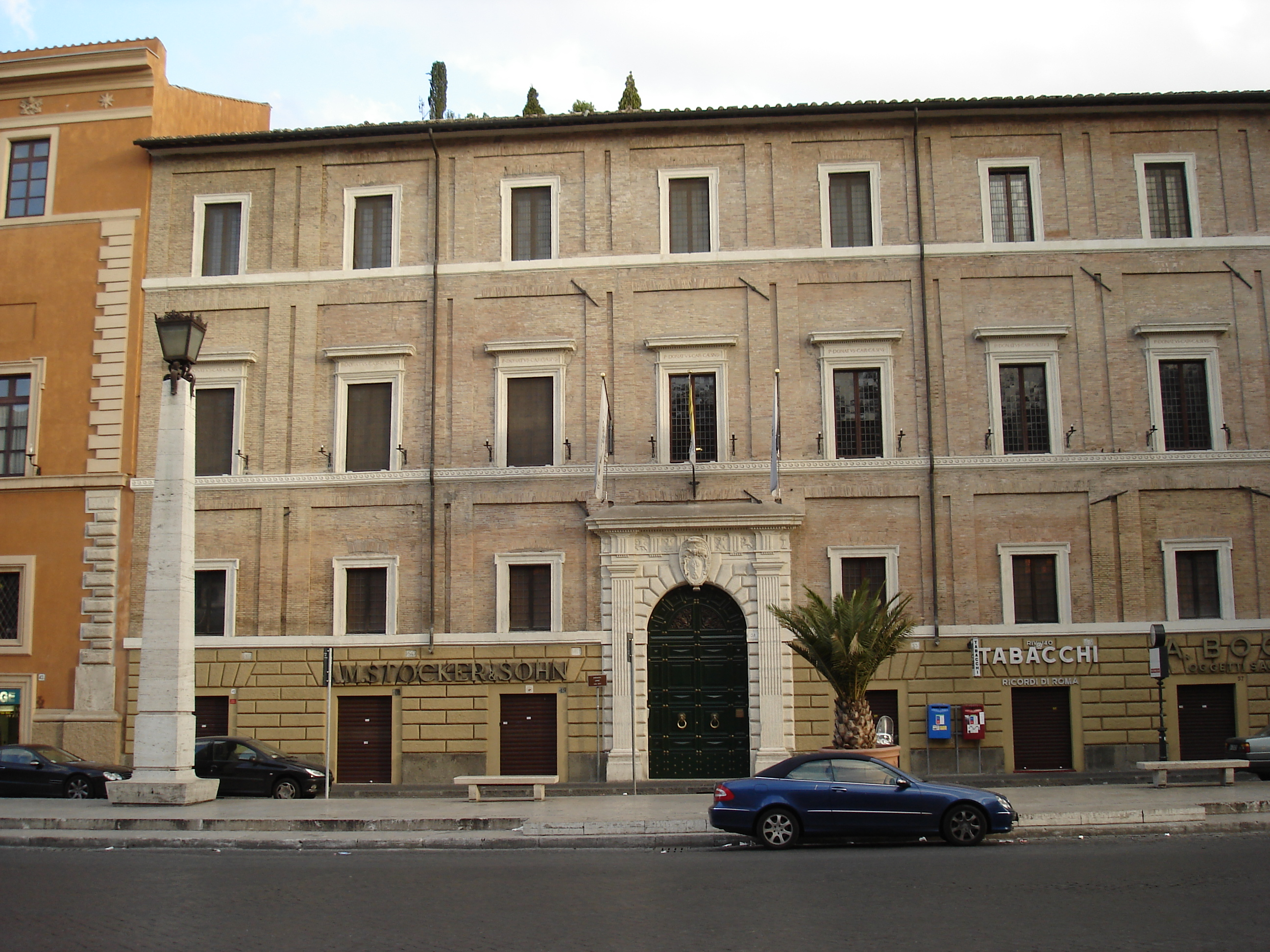
- The main front of the palace on Via della Conciliazione
- Interactive map of the Palazzo Cesi-Armellini area

General information
- Architectural style: Renaissance
- Location: Rome, Italy

Palazzo Cesi-Armellini, sometimes known plainly as Palazzo Cesi, is a late Renaissance building in Rome. It is considered important for historical and architectural reasons. The palace, which should not be confused with Palazzo Cesi-Gaddi, Palazzo Muti-Cesi, or the destroyed Palazzo Cesi, placed also in Borgo near the southern Colonnade of St. Peter's square, is one of the few Renaissance buildings of the rione Borgo to have survived the destruction of the central part of the neighborhood due to the 20th century construction of Via della Conciliazione, the avenue leading to St. Peter's Basilica. Today, it is owned by the Society of the Divine Savior and part of it is used as their motherhouse.

== Location ==
The palace is located in Rome’s Rione Borgo, between Via della Conciliazione and Borgo Santo Spirito, with the main front along the south side of the former road. The palace lies east of the southernmost of the two propylaea erected by Marcello Piacentini in 1950 to frame the view of Piazza Pio XII which is the forecourt to Saint Peter's Square. It borders to the east Palazzo Serristori, another Renaissance building.

== History ==
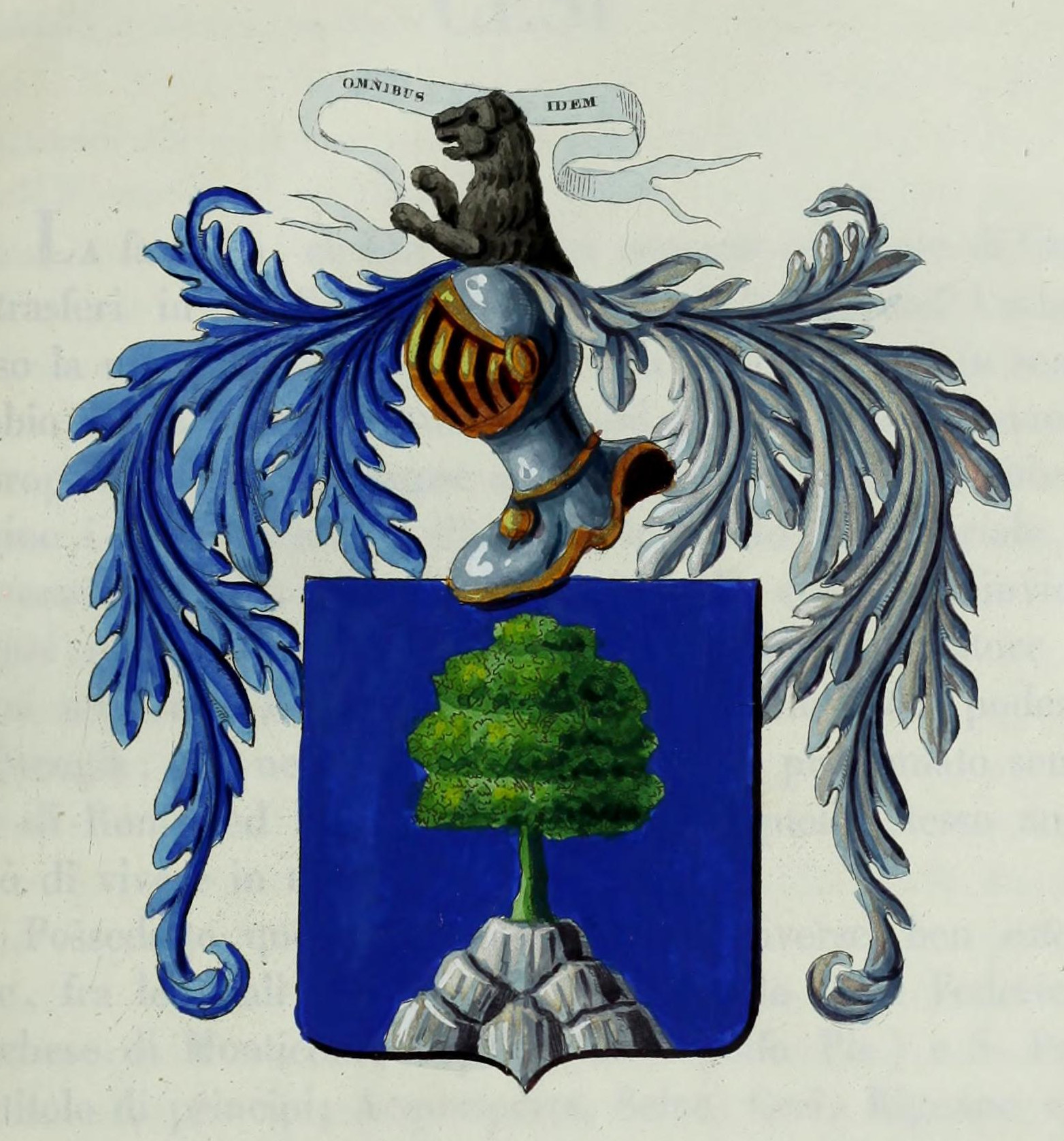
Coat of Arms of the House of Cesi

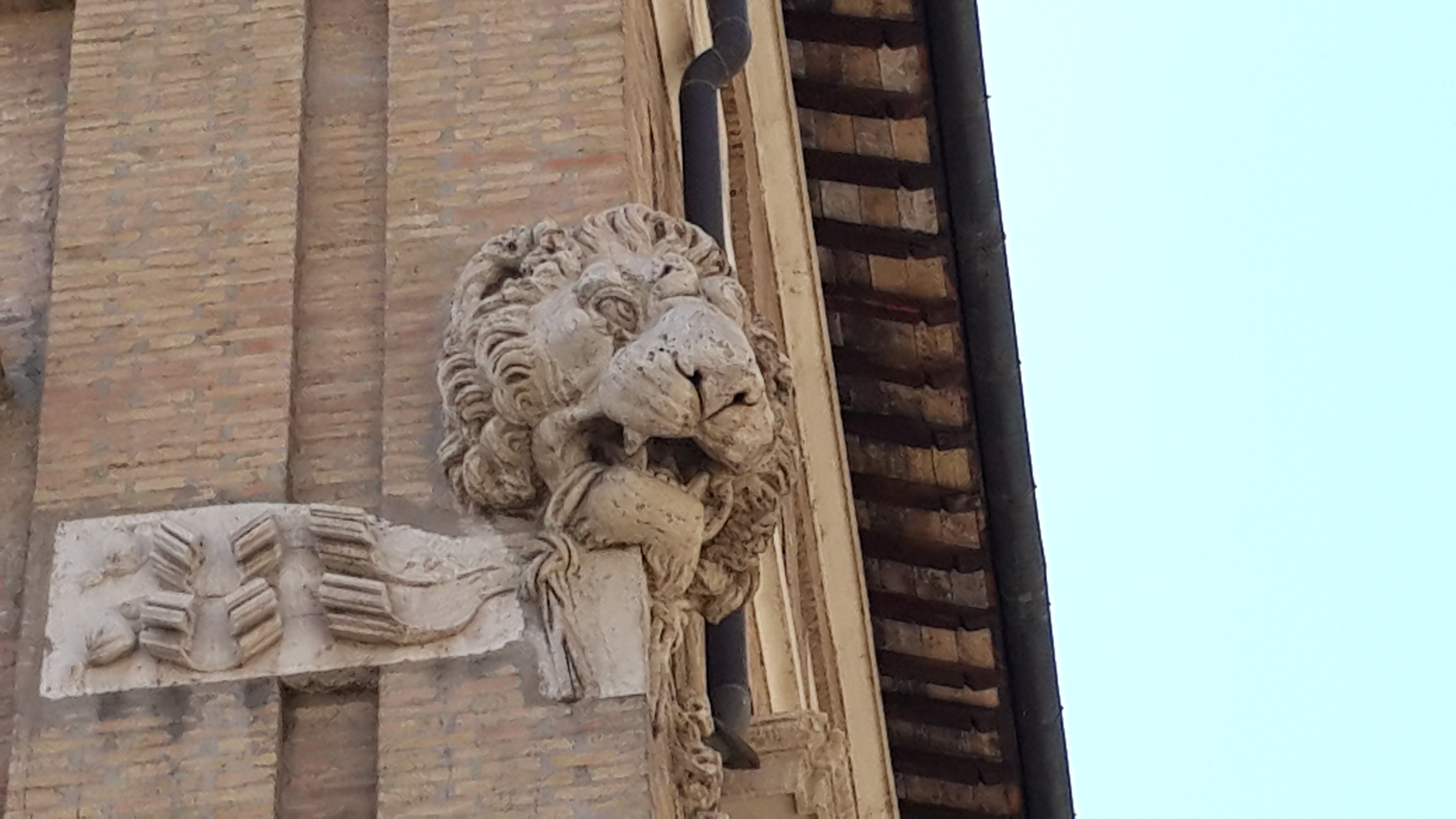
Lion mask on the NW side of Palazzo Cesi

The first palace on this site was erected between 1517 and 1520 by Cardinal Francesco Armellini, possibly after a project of Giulio Romano or his pupils. Armellini, born in Perugia, was a skilled financier. After moving to Rome, he became immensely rich and was appointed Cardinal and counselor by Pope Leo X Medici (r. 1513–21), who adopted him. Chief of the Medici party in Rome, after having risked to lose all his patrimony during the reign of Pope Adrian VI (r. 1522–3), he became treasurer under his successor Clement VII Medici (r. 1523–34). Armellini was indirectly responsible of the Sack of Rome in 1527, since in 1525 he unwisely advised the Pope to discharge almost all his soldiers, leaving the city almost without defense. On 6 May 1527, the Landsknechts of Holy Roman Emperor Charles V burst into the city pulling down a wall of his palace's garden while he was trying to bury there his jewels and the treasure of the pope. The palace was pillaged by the soldiers, and Armellini was barely able to escape to Castel Sant'Angelo, lifted up inside a basket. The palace erected by the cardinal was luxurious, served by 130 servants, and was decorated by artists like Martino da Parma, Giovenale da Narni and Anderlino da Mantova.

After Armellini's death in 1529 of the plague, the palace was inherited by relatives who in 1565 sold it to the noble Cesi family, of Umbrian origin. Angelo Cesi, bishop of Todi, and his brother Pier Donato took charge of the restructuring, relying for the new project on Martino Longhi the Elder, who between 1570 and 1588 oversaw the renovation into its present form. Both brothers were art lovers, and kept in the palace many antiques and a large book collection. Paolo Emilio Cesi, nephew of Pier Donato and also a patron of the arts, constructed the façade of the palace in 1587; his uncle had not been able to finish the work because of lack of money, used to enlarge his art collection. In 1618 the palace became briefly the seat of the Accademia dei Lincei, founded by Federico Cesi in 1603, and hosted until then in Palazzo Cesi Gaddi in Via della Maschera d'Oro, in rione Ponte. The building remained property of the Cesi until the extinction of the family in 1799. In 1819 it was bought by the brothers Giovanni Battista and Giuseppe Grazioli, scions of another noble Roman family. After other changes of ownership, the palace was bought in 1895 by the religious institute of the Salvatorians, who used it as its headquarters.

In 1939, during the works for the opening of Via della Conciliazione, the palace, which until that time had its main front on the Borgo Vecchio road, escaped destruction, but was modified according to a project of Marcello Piacentini and Attilio Spaccarelli. This entailed the reduction of the number of windows from twelve to eight, the shortening of the yard (which was a typical example of Renaissance ring yard) and the destruction – among other things – of the east wing with the monumental staircase and the angular tower. During the German occupation of Rome in World War II, the palace hosted many people (most of them Jews) escaping the Germans. These had been hidden there by the second superior general of the Salvatorians, father Pancrazio Pfeiffer, who was also instrumental in the decision to declare Rome an open city. Between 1944 and 1946 another wing of the building was erected along Borgo Santo Spirito. In 2004 a part of the palace was transformed into a hotel, and as of 2015 the building is still owned by the General Curia of the Society of the Divine Savior.

== Description ==
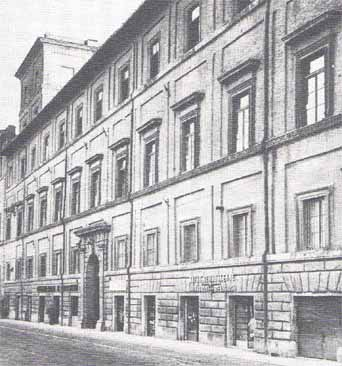
Palazzo Cesi in its original form with 12 windows and the angular tower, still along the Borgo Vecchio road, around 1900

Despite its 20th century reduction, the palace has retained its late Renaissance character, and together with the palazzi Torlonia, dei Penitenzieri, and Serristori, is one of the four Renaissance palaces in Borgo which survived the destruction of the spina between 1937 and 1950. The brick façade, which on the ground floor has a rusticated render, contains several shopfronts. The main portal, which was moved during the reduction of the façade from 12 to 8 bays, is flanked by two Doric pillars, and bears an entablature with metopes composed with architectonic elements of the Cesi family. The gate's keystone bears a monumental marble coat of arms of the Cesi family. The upper façade shows exposed bricks, and is chanted by double lesenes, which divide it in squares containing the windows, whose frames bear the inscription P.DONATUS.CAR.CAESIUS., Pier Donato Cesi's name in Latin. On the west corner has been mounted a shield bearing a protome representing a lion's head.

The yard originally had a square shape, with five arches borne by pillars. They bear Tuscan capitals at the ground floor and Ionic capitals at the noble floor. During the renovation the west wing, which was decorated with 16th-century frescoes representing putti and landscapes, has been shortened of two arches, so that the yard is now rectangular. The loggia on the yard is still decorated with a cycle of Renaissance frescoes representing the life of King Solomon, alternated with tondi representing women and winged putti. Behind the loggia there are several rooms decorated during the Renaissance with frescoes and elaborated coffer ceilings, the most notable of them being the one decorated with the coat of arms of the house of Cesi. In 1950 a living room at the ground floor has been decorated with ten frescoes representing the seats of the Salvatorian order around the world.

== Sources ==
- Borgatti, Mariano (1926). Borgo e S. Pietro nel 1300 – 1600 – 1925 (in Italian). Roma: Federico Pustet.
- Ceccarelli, Giuseppe (Ceccarius) (1938). La "Spina" dei Borghi (in Italian). Roma: Danesi.
- Castagnoli, Ferdinando; Cecchelli, Carlo; Giovannoni, Gustavo; Zocca, Mario (1958). Topografia e urbanistica di Roma (in Italian). Bologna: Cappelli.
- De Caro, Gaspare (1962). "Armellini Medici, Francesco". Dizionario Biografico degli Italiani (in Italian). Roma: Enciclopedia Italiana.
- Gigli, Laura (1992). Guide rionali di Roma (in Italian). Vol. Borgo (III). Roma: Fratelli Palombi Editori. ISSN 0393-2710.
- Cambedda, Anna (1990). La demolizione della Spina dei Borghi (in Italian). Roma: Fratelli Palombi Editori. ISSN 0394-9753.
- Spagnesi, Gianfranco (2003). La Basilica di San Pietro, il borgo e la città (in Italian). Jaca book, Milano. ISBN 88-16-40605-4.
