= Via della Conciliazione =

Thoroughfare in Rome, Italy

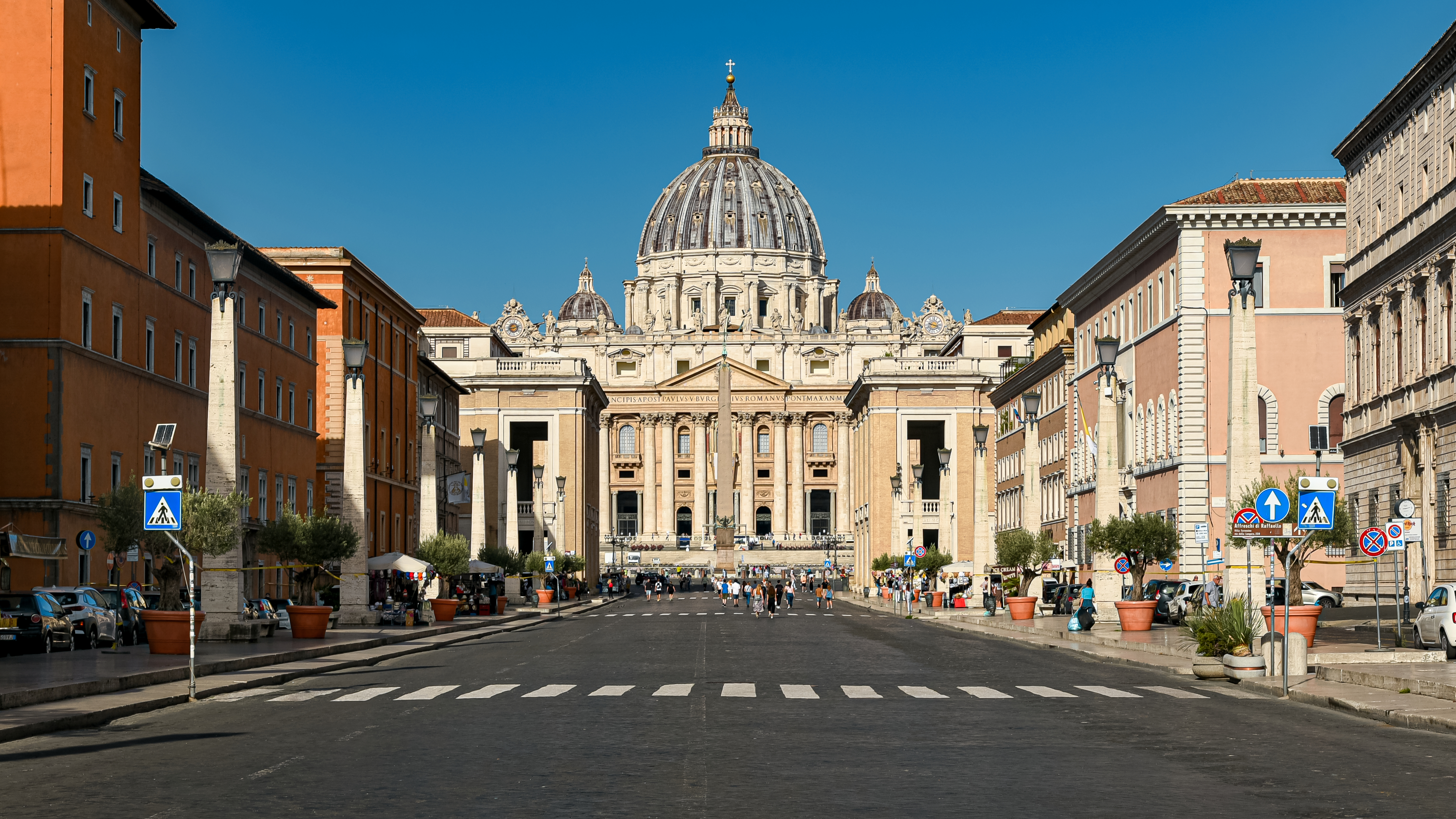
- A view from ground level of the Via della Conciliazione. Note that the dome of the Basilica is not centered, as Piacentini chose instead to centre on the obelisk, which had been moved on the orders of Sixtus V.
- Interactive map of Via della Conciliazione
- Location: Rome, Italy
- Coordinates: 41°54′08.28″N 12°27′43.20″E

Via della Conciliazione ("Road of the Conciliation") is a street in the Rione of Borgo within Rome, Italy. Roughly 500 metres (1,600 ft) in length, it connects Saint Peter's Square to the Castel Sant'Angelo on the western bank of the Tiber River. The road was constructed between 1936 and 1950, and it is the primary access route to the Square. In addition to shops, it is bordered by a number of historical and religious buildings – including the Palazzo Torlonia, the Palazzo dei Penitenzieri and the Palazzo dei Convertendi, and the churches of Santa Maria in Traspontina and Santo Spirito in Sassia.

Despite being one of the few major thoroughfares in Rome able to cope with a high volume of traffic without congestion, it is the subject of much ire both within the Roman community and among historical scholars due to the circumstances under which it was constructed. The area around the church was rebuilt several times following the various Sacks of Rome, and again after having deteriorated due to the loss of prosperity resulting from the Papacy's relocation to Avignon during the 14th century. Through all of these reconstructions, the area in front of the short courtyard of Saint Peter's Basilica remained a maze of densely packed structures overhanging narrow side-streets and alleyways.

== Previous plans ==
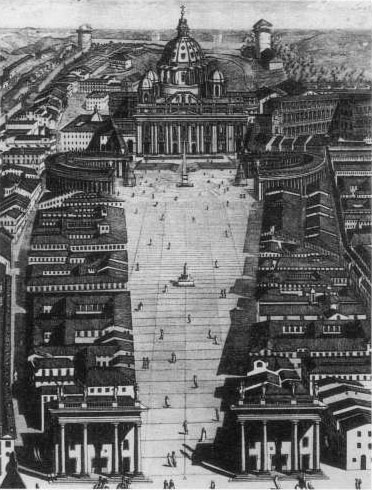
A 1776 concept for an open V-shaped boulevard.

Plans were drawn up several times over the years for the construction of a major link between the Vatican City and the centre of Rome; the number of submissions increasing dramatically with the onset of the Italian Renaissance. The first design was submitted by Leone Battista Alberti during the reign of Pope Nicholas V, and formed one of the two perennial designs proposed for the area. Alberti envisioned an "open" plan, consisting of a single voluminous V-shaped boulevard, widest at St. Peter's Basilica itself and tapering as it approached the Tiber. The other scheme of designs submitted by architects was a "closed" plan that would consist of two roads arching outwards in an ellipse, with the Tiber and the Square at opposite ends. Proponents of a closed plan would usually suggest that the space between the two causeways be separated by a colonnade, or by a row of inhabited structures whose designs would be scrutinised and approved by architects employed by the Holy See. Variations on both themes were submitted time and time again. Proponents of an "open" plan included such architects as Giovanni Battista Nolli and Cosimo Morelli. A number of other architects, such as Carlo Fontana, and at least one Pope (Sixtus V) favoured a "closed" design, with a number of streets radiating from the central square, maintaining the "spina", or spine, of the structures of Borgo directly between the square and the Tiber. Neither approach moved beyond sketches and blueprints. Both open and closed designs were considered by the Vatican, but were ultimately discarded for reasons of expense. A thorough examination of the costs of constructing a thoroughfare was made by the Vatican-approved St. Peter's Building Commission in 1651. Their conclusion was that "the cardinals' proposal to demolish all the buildings between the Borgo Nuovo and the Borgo Vecchio for a greater and longer vista to the church" would be infeasible due to inordinately high expropriation costs and vested property interests.

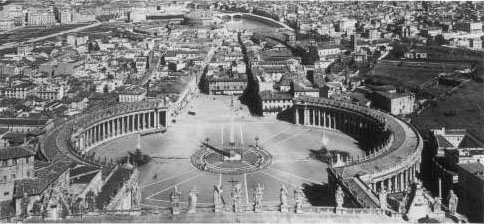
A photograph of Saint Peter's Square and the area now occupied by the Via della Conciliazione, taken c. 1900.

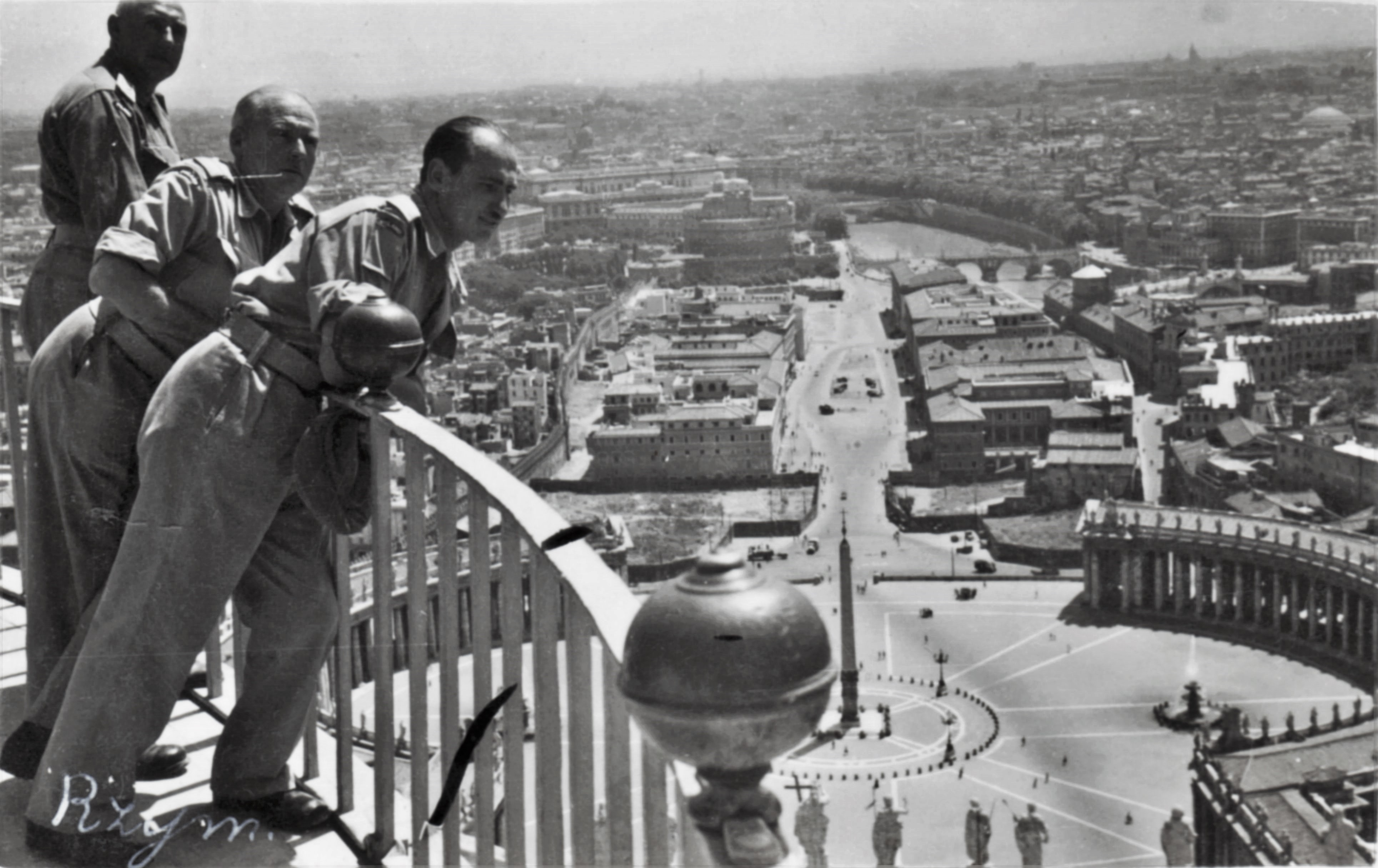
The view down Via della Conciliazione from Saint Peter's Basilica in 1946.

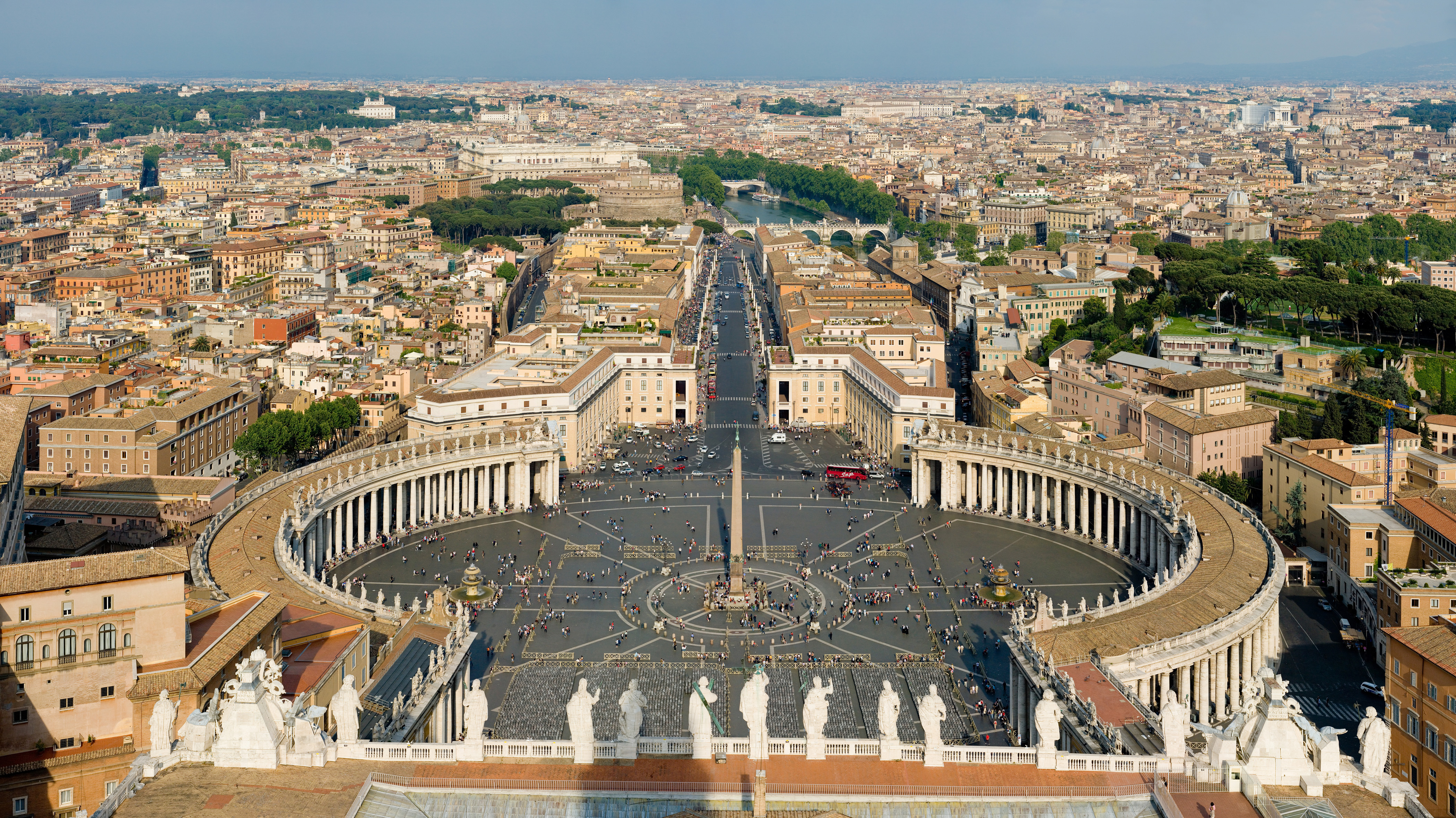
The view down Via della Conciliazione from Saint Peter's Basilica, as it appeared in 2007.

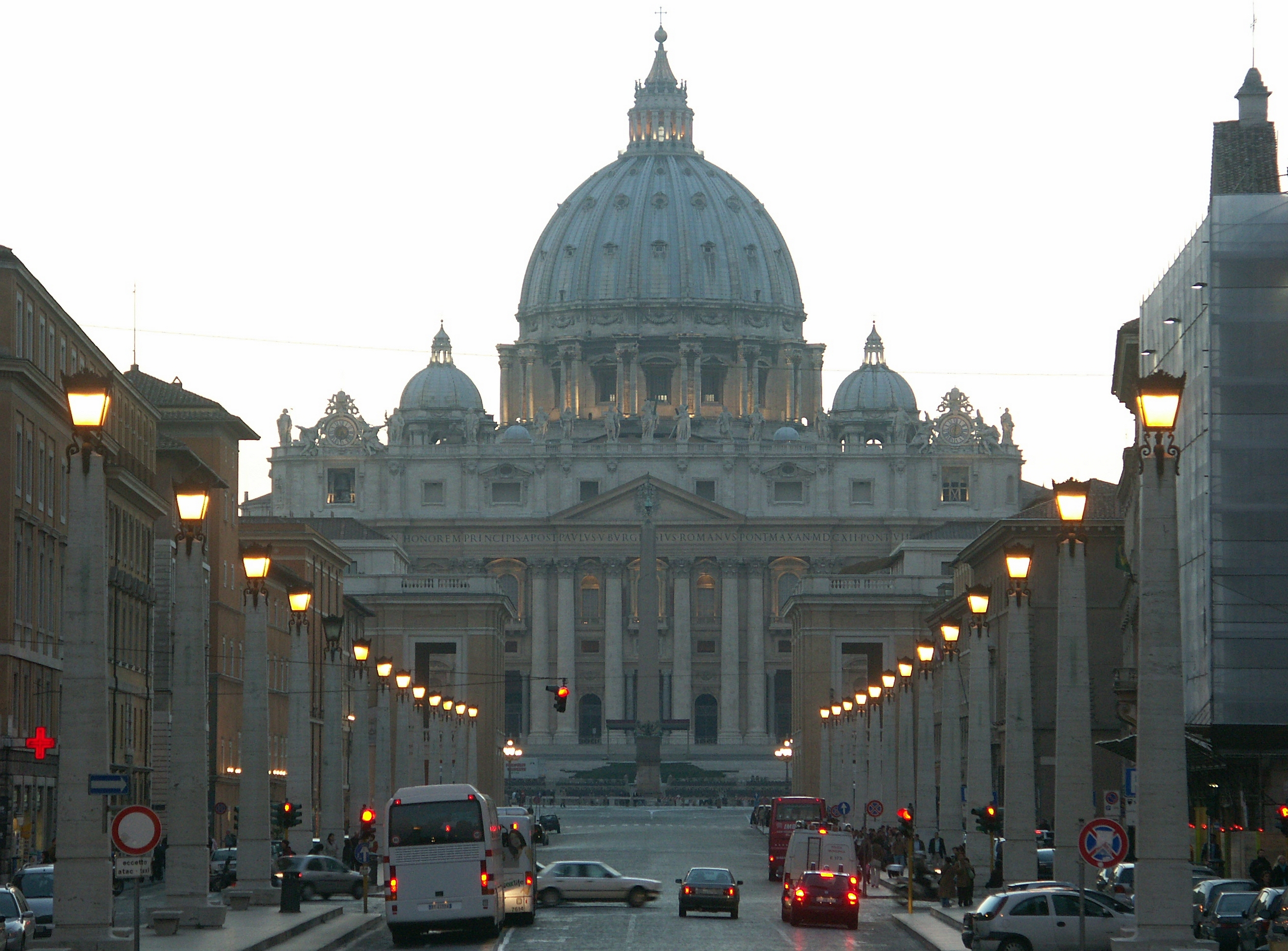
View from Via della Conciliazione to Saint Peter's Basilica, as it appeared in 2007.

Further momentum was lost when Gian Lorenzo Bernini was commissioned to redesign the terrace in front of the Basilica in 1656. After discarding several sketches, Bernini settled on a colossal open space in the shape of an ellipse. With the potential expense of clearing Borgo, Bernini decided instead to make use of the warren of poorly maintained medieval buildings to obscure any view of the Vatican structures from any significant distance. In this way, pilgrims emerged from the relative darkness of the city into the vast open space and grandeur of the Square and its surrounding buildings – a sight calculated to inspire awe in first-time visitors to the Holy See's seat of power. Bernini had originally planned to demolish a square roughly 100 m to a side directly in front of the square, filling the space with a third colonnade (or "terzo braccio") to match the two still standing today. This would afford a longer vantage point to allow visitors a better viewing angle of the new Basilica. The death of his patron, Pope Alexander VII, put a halt to Bernini's work. The third set of columns was abandoned, and Bernini's piazza remained open-ended and incomplete.

From the final major reconstruction of Borgo in the 15th century, the site which the Via della Conciliazione now covers remained occupied by residential, religious, and historical buildings for nearly 500 years. The final impetus behind the road's construction was primarily political. Borgo, along with the rest of the Papal States outside of the Vatican itself, was taken by the Kingdom of Italy during the Italian unification in the 19th Century – leading to Pope Pius IX's declaration that he had become a prisoner in the Vatican and the formation of the Roman Question. For the next 59 years, the Popes refused to leave the Vatican, in order to avoid any appearance of accepting the authority wielded by the Italian government over Rome as a whole. Initially, parts of the Italian government welcomed this, expecting the influence of the Papacy to fade to the point that enough political support could be gained to abolish it altogether. However, this failed to come to pass, and eventually a compromise acceptable to both states was reached in the Lateran Treaty of 1929.

== Mussolini and Rome ==
Dictator Benito Mussolini, who had signed the accord on behalf of the King, resurrected the idea of a grand thoroughfare symbolically connecting the Vatican to the heart of the Italian capital. To fulfil this vision, Mussolini turned to the prominent Fascist architects Marcello Piacentini and Attilio Spaccarelli. Drawing inspiration from a number of the designs submitted by Carlo Fontana, Piacentini came up with a plan that would preserve the best aspects of both the "open" and "closed" designs – a grand boulevard that would nonetheless obscure the majority of the Vatican buildings per Bernini's intentions. The vast colonnaded street would require the clearance of the whole "spina" of Borgo placed in between the Basilica and the Castle. Since the facades of the buildings lining this space did not align perfectly, in order to create the illusion of a perfectly straight causeway traffic islands would be erected along both sides, with rows of obelisks leading towards the Square, doubling as lampposts. These were also intended to reduce the effect that the funnel-shaped design would have on perspective when facing the Basilica. The wings of those buildings closest to the square would be preserved to form propylaea, blocking the greater portion of the Vatican City from approaching visitors and framing the Square and Basilica at the head of a grand open space that would allow for easy vehicular access.

== Construction ==
Demolition of the spina of Borgo began with Mussolini's symbolic strike of the first building with a pickaxe on 29 October 1936 and continued for twelve months. Even at the time, the demolition proved controversial, with many Borgo residents displaced en masse to settlements ("borgate") outside of the city. Among the buildings dismantled, either totally or in part, and rebuilt in another position, were the Palazzo dei Convertendi, the house of Giacomo Bartolomeo da Brescia, the Church of the Nunziatina, and the palaces Rusticucci-Accoramboni and degli Alicorni (the latter had been already demolished in 1931). Other buildings, including the palace of the Governatore di Borgo and the Churches of San Giacomo Scossacavalli and Sant'Angelo al Corridore, were not rebuilt after their destruction. Facing into the cleared area are five other historical buildings, the Palazzo Giraud Torlonia, the church of Santa Maria in Traspontina, the Palazzo dei Penitenzieri, Palazzo Serristori, and Palazzo Cesi (which was mutilated).

The construction of the road was only a small feature in the reconstruction of Rome ordered by Mussolini, which ranged from the restoration of the Castel Sant'Angelo, the clearance of the Mausoleum of Augustus, to the vastly more complicated site of the Via dell'Impero through Rome's ancient imperial remains. His plan was to transform Rome into a monument to Italian fascism.

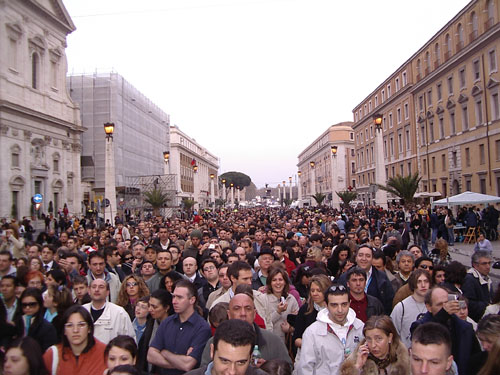
Crowds spilling into the Via della Conciliazione during the funeral of Pope John Paul II.

In five years, Rome must appear marvellous to all the peoples of the world; vast, orderly, powerful, as it was in the time of the first empire of Augustus.

— Benito Mussolini

Construction of the road continued long after Mussolini's death and the abolition of Italian Fascism. The obelisks along the road were installed in time for the Jubilee of 1950.

== Today ==
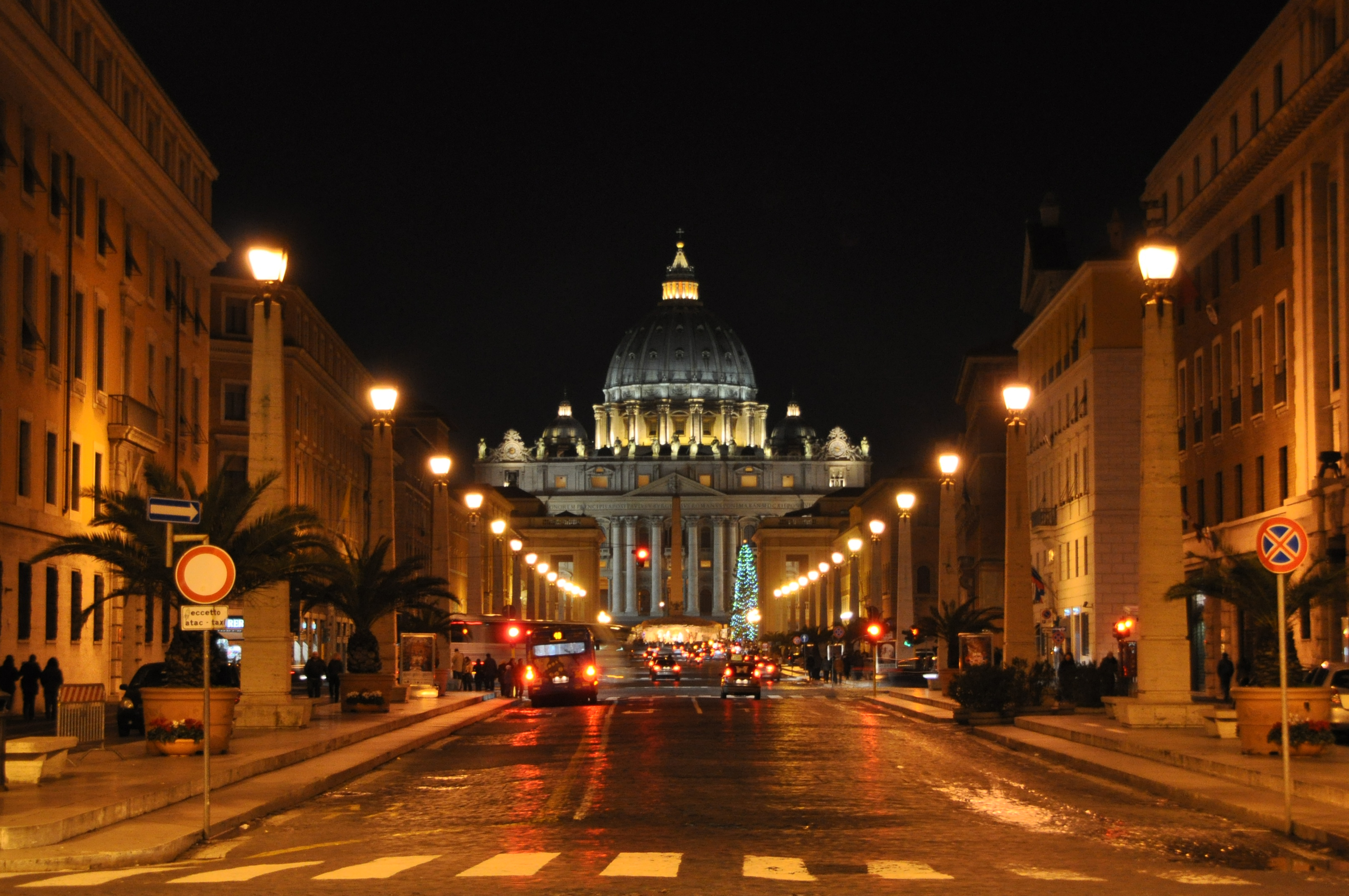
Via della Conciliazione at night.

Since its completion, the road has acted as the primary access point to St. Peter's Square, and by extension to the Vatican City itself. At times, such as during the funeral of Pope John Paul II, it has acted as an extension to the square itself, allowing a greater number of visitors to attend functions conducted there.

== See also ==
- Index of Vatican City-related articles

| Preceded by Via del Corso | Landmarks of Rome; Via della Conciliazione | Succeeded by Via dei Fori Imperiali |
