= Palazzo del Governatore di Borgo =

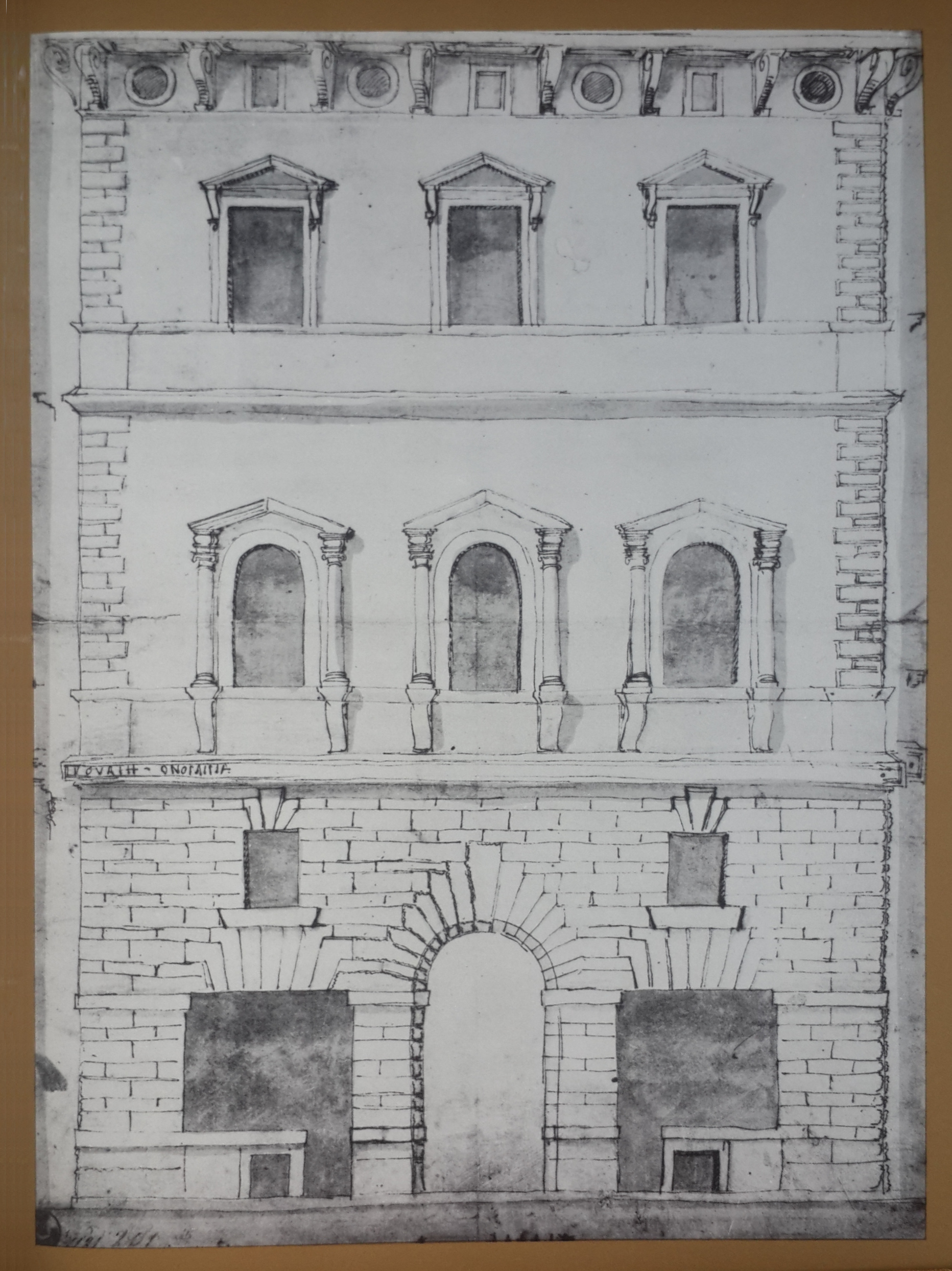
Drawing of the facade attributed to Antonio da Sangallo the Younger. Uffizi, 201 A. The drawing bears the inscription: Di m.ro Antonio in Borgo

The Palazzo del Governatore di Borgo, also called Palazzo delle Prigioni di Borgo, Palazzo del Soldano, or Palazzo dal Pozzo, was a Renaissance palace in Rome, important for artistic and historical reasons. Designed by Antonio da Sangallo the Younger, it was demolished in 1936 for the opening of Via della Conciliazione.

== Location ==
The palace was in the Borgo rione of Rome and was part of the so-called spina (the name derives from its resemblance to the median strip of a Roman circus), composed of several blocks stretched in an east–west direction between Castel Sant'Angelo and San Pietro. It was between the streets of Borgo Nuovo (to the north, opposite the church of Santa Maria in Traspontina, where it had the main entrance) and Borgo Vecchio (to the south). To the west it overlooked the vicolo dritto ("straight alley"), "one among the stinkiest in the zone" in the 1930s.

== Designations ==
The palace bore several names: Palazzo del Governatore di Borgo, Palazzo delle Prigioni di Borgo, Palazzo del Soldano or Palazzo dal Pozzo. The first two denominations were linked to its public functions (governor's residence and jail). The third derived either from having been the prison of Turks captured during the Battle of Lepanto, who were imprisoned here for a short time, or from having been the seat of the "Soldano", that is, the chief of the papal police. The fourth derived from its having been the residence of the dal Pozzo family.

== History ==
In 1501 Fabiano de' Cavallicci, a cleric originally from Novara, Piedmont, before dying bequeathed half of his house in Borgo to the convent of Sant'Onofrio at the Gianicolo, and half to the San Salvatore's hospital; the latter lent its share. In 1526 the latter part was sold to Jacopo Bernardino Ferrari, "maestro del registro delle bolle" ("master of the bulls register"), who had already bought the other half of the building. The officer of the Apostolic Chancery wished to enlarge his property and erect in its place a palace. Ferrari commissioned the construction to Antonio da Sangallo the Younger; the attribution of the project to the Tuscan architect is based on several drawings—kept in the Uffizi gallery—by his hand or executed by Aristotile and Giovan Francesco da Sangallo and Baldassarre Peruzzi.

Ferrari probably died during the Sack of Rome in 1527, and the ownership of the palace passed to Pietro Paolo Arditio, notary of the Apostolic Chamber. According to Gustavo Giovannoni, the palace was built instead by Guglielmo dal Pozzo, apostolic protonotary, who died in 1527 and was buried in Santa Maria in Traspontina. Giovannoni bases this attribution on his discovery of two coats of arms of the dal Pozzo family carved on two keystones in the hall and in the courtyard of the building. However, no document related to the building in which the name of dal Pozzo is mentioned has been found so far.

In 1571 an heir of Arditio, Girolamo, sold the building to the Apostolic Chamber. The Chamber destined it to the seat of the curia of the Governor of the Borgo (district at that time separated from Rome), the relative court and the prisons; the latter replaced the jail in the Giustina tower near Palazzo Cesi, after its demolition. The office of Governor of the Borgo was established by Pope Julius III (r. 1550–1555) on February 22, 1550, and abolished by Clement X (r. 1670–1676) in the year of his death. The jurisdiction of the magistrate extended from the S. Pietro gate by Castel Sant'Angelo to Porta Settimiana in Trastevere. Being a key position, the governor was almost always a relative of the pontiff.

During this period the building witnessed truculent events and hosted important persons in its prison, which was similar to other Roman jails but without necessary services such as the infirmary. In 1561 a boy working by the osteria del cavalletto ("easel inn") in Borgo Vecchio, accused of theft, after confessing jumped from a window of the building. Although he had died in the nearby Santo Spirito hospital, he was sentenced to be hanged dead in front of the inn where he had worked. In September 1596 Francesco Cenci, the depraved father of Beatrice, was a guest of the prisons of Borgo for a month; he was convicted after having been surprised in an act of love with the wife of a shoemaker. Cenci had been sentenced to be whipped but was able to avoid punishment thanks to the intercession of the Cardinal Anton Maria Salviati. In March 1599 three guards of the Bargello were hanged in front of the prisons after having been accused of burglary against the "procaccio of Naples", the postal courier for the campanian city, which they were supposed to escort.

In 1676 the palace was transformed into a rental house, and with the years it deteriorated greatly: at the time of its demolition in 1936 it was devoid of the window pediments and aediculas. The architects Marcello Piacentini and Attilio Spaccarelli, designers of via della Conciliazione, demolished the ancient building, whose reconstruction was originally planned, saving only the portal which, surmounted by an attic to bring it to the level of the portals of the other edifices of the road, was reassembled on the new building in via della Conciliazione n. 15.

== Architecture ==
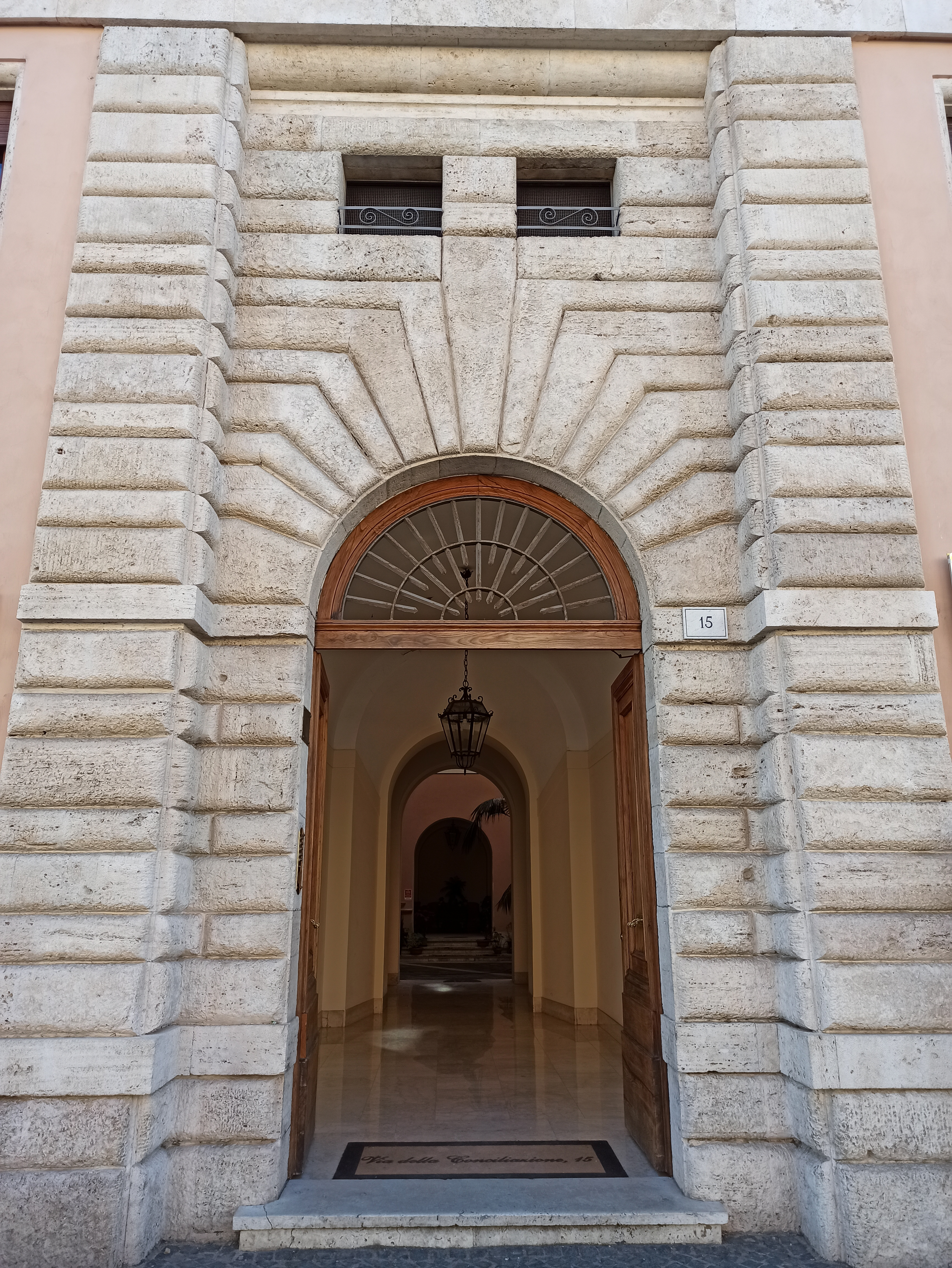
The reassembled portal of the Palazzo del Pozzo in via della Conciliazione 15, Rome

The building, presenting the grim appearance of a massive tower, was erected in a low-length longitudinal plot. It had a ground floor in travertine with large bossage, with a base shoe that reached the first belt course. In the center of the facade was a portal flanked by two shops, following the example of the Forum of Caesar in Rome. The ground floor was surmounted by two brick floors marked by mighty corner bossage; the first was marked by six windows with aediculas flanked by half-columns supported by corbels similar to those used on the top floor of Palazzo Farnese, derived from the entrance portal of the Trajan's Market towards Quirinal Hill. Each of the six windows on the second floor was surmounted by a triangular tympanum. The attic windows opened in the eaves were supported by brackets.

According to Paolo Portoghesi, Palazzo dal Pozzo is one of the first works showing the artistic maturity of Sangallo, whose culture was "now free from uncertainties and consciously directed to the re-acquisition of classical elements".

== Sources ==
- Borgatti, Mariano (1926). Borgo e S. Pietro nel 1300 – 1600 – 1925 (in Italian). Roma: Federico Pustet.
- Ceccarelli, Giuseppe (Ceccarius) (1938). La "Spina" dei Borghi (in Italian). Roma: Danesi.
- Portoghesi, Paolo (1970). Roma del Rinascimento (in Italian). Milano: Electa.
- Delli, Sergio (1988). Le strade di Roma (in Italian). Roma: Newton & Compton.
- Gigli, Laura (1990). Guide rionali di Roma (in Italian). Vol. Borgo (I). Roma: Fratelli Palombi Editori. ISSN 0393-2710.
- Cambedda, Anna (1990). La demolizione della Spina dei Borghi (in Italian). Roma: Fratelli Palombi Editori.
- Benevolo, Leonardo (2004). San Pietro e la città di Roma (in Italian). Bari: Laterza. ISBN 8842072362.
