= Palazzo Serristori, Rome =

Coordinates: 41°54′6.74″N 12°27′37.50″E

Palazzo Serristori
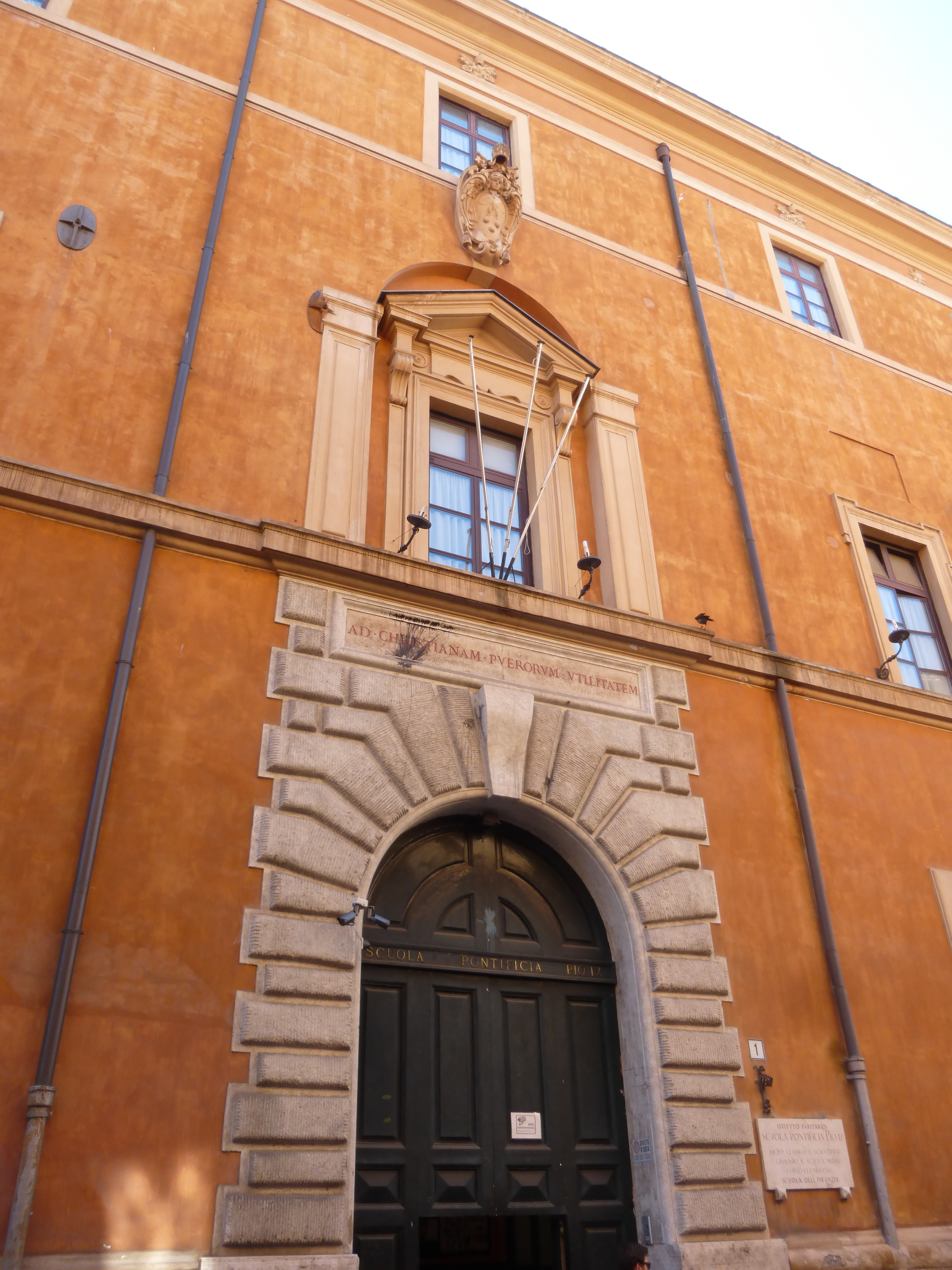
- The main door of the palace
- Interactive map of the Palazzo Serristori area

General information
- Location: Rome, Italy

Palazzo Serristori is a Renaissance building in Rome, important for historical and architectural reasons. The palace is one of the few Renaissance buildings of the rione Borgo to have outlived the destruction of the central part of the neighborhood due to the building of Via della Conciliazione, the grand avenue leading to St. Peter's Basilica.

== Location ==
The palace is located in Rome, in rione Borgo, between Via della Conciliazione and Borgo Santo Spirito, with the main front facing east along Via dei Cavalieri del Santo Sepolcro. It lies east of Palazzo Cesi-Armellini and faces to the east Palazzo Della Rovere, two remarkable Renaissance buildings.

== History ==
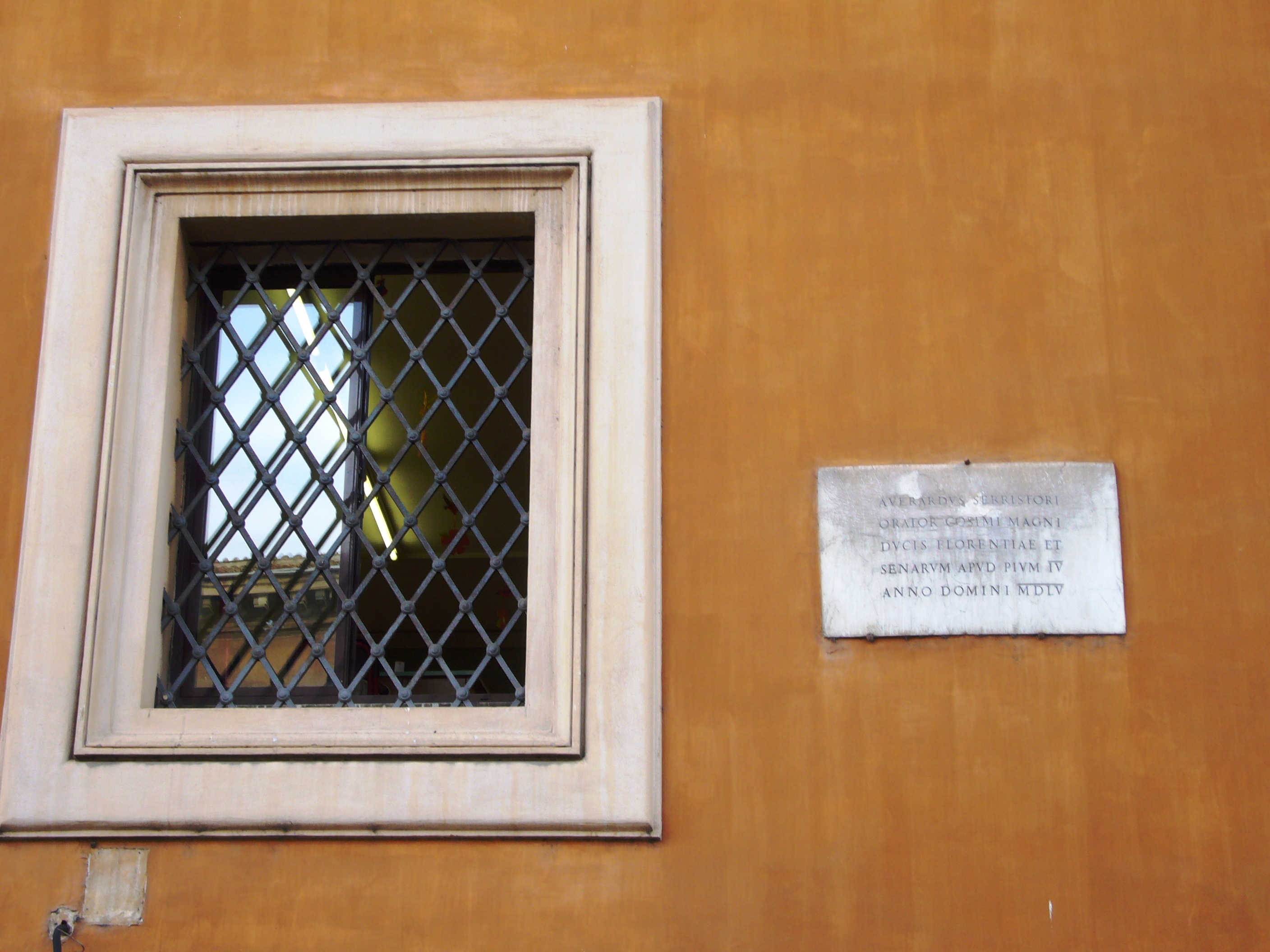
Renaissance plate of Averardo Serristori, the founder of the palace

At the end of the 15th century on this area lay a small palace property of Cesare Borgia, one of the children of Pope Alexander VI (r. 1492–1503). Afterwards, the building was owned by Cardinal Bartolomeo Della Rovere, a staunch enemy of the Borgias. In 1565 it was pulled down, and a new palace was erected by Averardo Serristori, ambassador of Grand Duke of Tuscany Cosimo Medici to Pope Pius IV (r. 1559–65). The building became the seat of the embassy of Tuscany before this was moved to Palazzo Firenze in rione Campo Marzio, and remained property of the Serristori family until 1821.

In that year the Apostolic Camera bought it and transformed it in the barracks of the Papal Zouaves. In 1867, at the eve of the happenings leading to the Battle of Mentana, Giuseppe Monti and Gaetano Tognetti, two revolutionaries fighting for the annexation of Rome to the Kingdom of Italy, placed a mine in a storeroom under the palace. This exploded on 22 October 1867 destroying a whole wing of the building and killing 23 Zouaves (nine of them Italians, members of the unit's musical ensemble, then soldiers under duty or punishment) and four civilians. The two revolutionaries were both captured, sentenced to death and executed one year later.

After 1870, the year when Rome was annexed to Italy, the edifice became a barrack (Italian: Caserma) of the Bersaglieri, first named "Caserma Serristori" and after 1904 "Caserma Luciano Manara" after the hero of the Roman Republic of 1849. In 1920 the palace became a dwelling-place. In 1927, the building hosting the "Scuola Pontificia Pio IX", founded by Pope Pius IX (r. 1846–78) in 1859, lying in Piazza Pia (at the entrance of Borgo near the Tiber) and led by the religious institute of the Brothers of Our Lady of Mercy, had to be pulled down since the square had to be enlarged. Two years later, within the framework of the Lateran Pacts the Holy See got back the ownership of Palazzo Serristori, and the school was moved there, with the financial help of Pope Pius XI and of the city of Rome. The palace was modified by architect Alberto Calza Bini to adapt it to the new function. As of 2015 the school remains one of the most important in the city, hosting about one thousand students, attending primary and secondary school, Liceo Classico and scientifico. From the school depend also the sports society "Fortitudo 1908", one of the most traditional in Rome, whose football section (whose members were nicknamed "The lions of Borgo") merged with other two clubs in 1927 to form the A.S. Roma, and the "Filodrammatica Roma", an amateur dramatic society attended by some among the best 20th century Italian actors, like Renato Rascel, Amedeo Nazzari and Andreina Pagnani.

== Description ==
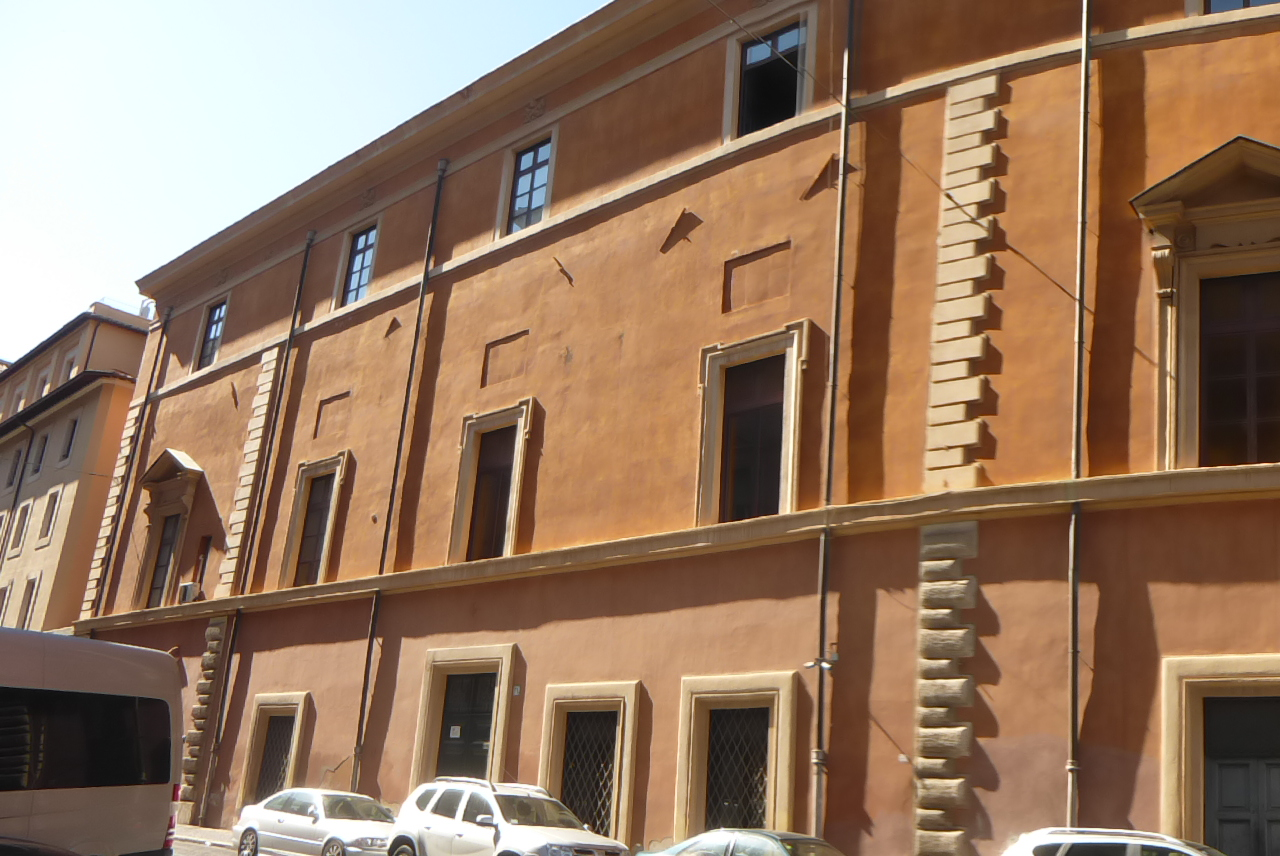
The front of the palace looking towards Borgo Santo Spirito

The building, according to a description from the time of Pope Clement VIII (r. 1592–1605), had a front with 9 windows, a yard, and was 50 Roman feet long and 85 Roman feet wide (ca. 15m × 25 m). The main front has square windows and at its center a portal framed by rustication. The motif of the Keys of Heaven is repeated all around the cornice. Above the portal is located a window framed by two lesenes surmounted by a triangular pediment. The window is surmounted by a shield bearing the coat of arms of Pope Pius XI (r. 1922–39). Originally above the portal there was a Latin inscription referring to Averardo Serristori, now moved on the side facing Via della Conciliazione. A new Latin inscription, which recites "AD CHRISTIANAM PUERORUM UTILITATE" ("For the Christian profit of the children"), coming from the destroyed school in Piazza Pia, near Castel Sant'Angelo, has been put in its place.

Internally, the palace still maintains the original, large square Renaissance yard with a loggia with arches bearing up on pillars, and an open gallery, also with arches. A fountain, originally placed at the yards center, has been remounted near the yard's west side. Over the nearby wall it has been placed a Latin inscription praising Pope Pius XI. The interior of the building still shows remains of frescoes with military and patriotic subjects painted after 1870. The palace includes also a chapel, devoted to the Virgin of Mercy. The chapel has a rectangular plan, ended up with a palladian window which introduces into a cantoria covered by a groin vault. The chapel is decorated with frescoes painted in 1934 by Fra Aureliano Scaffoletti. The 19th century altar comes from the destroyed school of Piazza Pia and is surmounted by a representation of the Virgin of Mercy flanked by two angels.

== Sources ==
- Borgatti, Mariano (1926). Borgo e S. Pietro nel 1300 – 1600 – 1925 (in Italian). Roma: Federico Pustet.
- Ceccarelli, Giuseppe (Ceccarius) (1938). La "Spina" dei Borghi (in Italian). Roma: Danesi.
- Castagnoli, Ferdinando; Cecchelli, Carlo; Giovannoni, Gustavo; Zocca, Mario (1958). Topografia e urbanistica di Roma (in Italian). Bologna: Cappelli.
- Gigli, Laura (1992). Guide rionali di Roma (in Italian). Vol. Borgo (III). Roma: Fratelli Palombi Editori. ISSN 0393-2710.
- Cambedda, Anna (1990). La demolizione della Spina dei Borghi (in Italian). Roma: Fratelli Palombi Editori. ISSN 0394-9753.
- Severini, Marco (2012). "Monti, Giuseppe". Dizionario Biografico degli Italiani (in Italian). Roma: Enciclopedia Italiana.
