= St. Peter's Square =

Piazza in Vatican City

- City square
- Piazza San Pietro
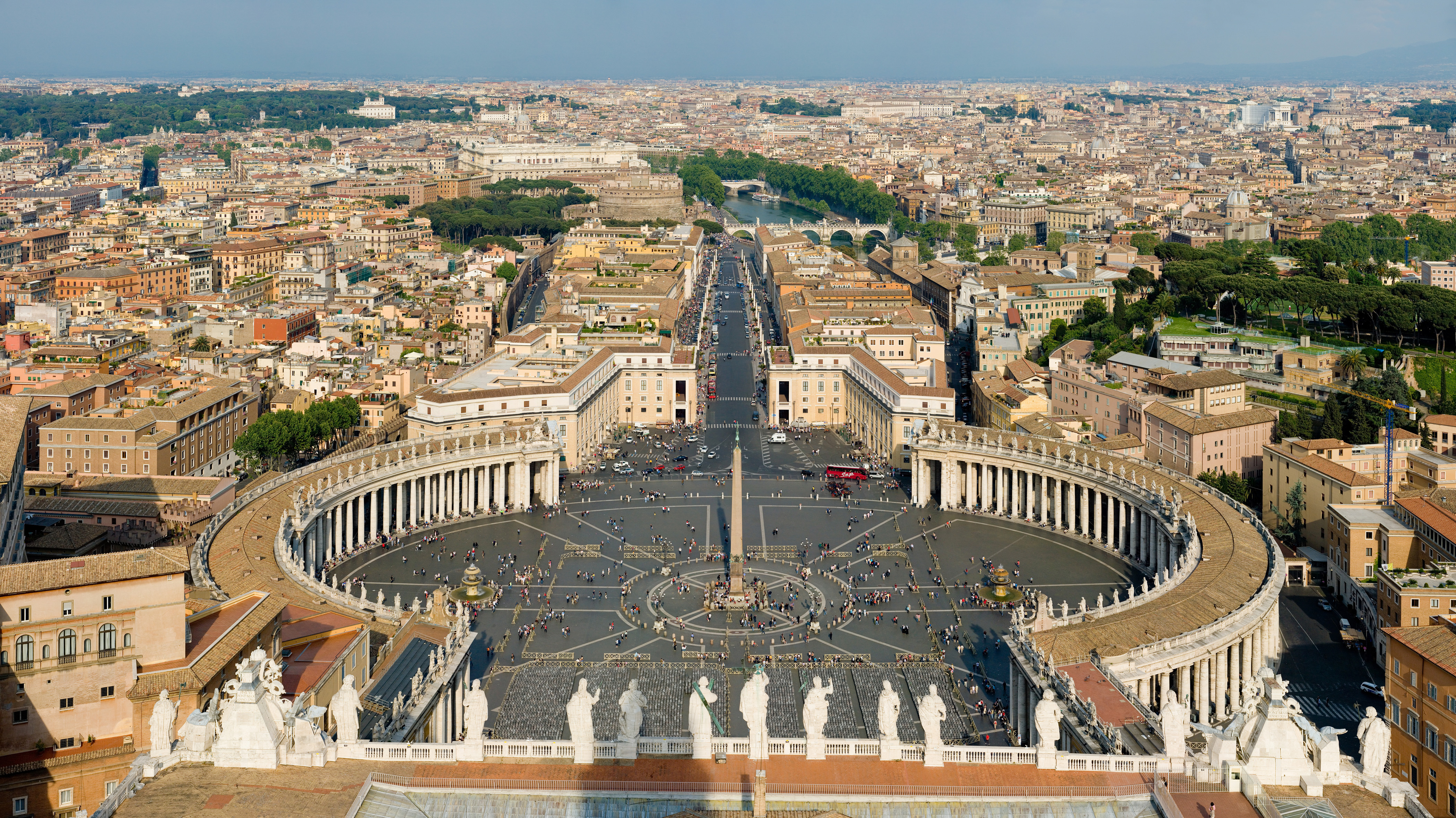
- St. Peter's Square as seen from the dome of St. Peter's Basilica, facing east towards Via della Conciliazione
- Design: Gianlorenzo Bernini
- Location: Vatican City
- Interactive map of St. Peter's Square
- Coordinates: 41°54′08″N 12°27′26″E

St. Peter's Square (Latin: Forum Sancti Petri, Italian: Piazza San Pietro [ˈpjattsa sam ˈpjɛːtro]) is a large plaza located directly in front of St. Peter's Basilica in Vatican City, the papal enclave in Rome, directly west of the neighborhood (rione) of Borgo. Both the square and the basilica are named after Saint Peter, an apostle of Jesus whom Catholics consider the first pope.

At the centre of the square is the Vatican obelisk, an ancient Egyptian obelisk erected at the current site in 1586. Gian Lorenzo Bernini designed the square almost 100 years later, including the massive Tuscan colonnades, four columns deep, which embrace visitors in "the maternal arms of Mother Church". A granite fountain constructed by Bernini in 1675 matches another fountain designed by Carlo Maderno in 1613.

== History ==
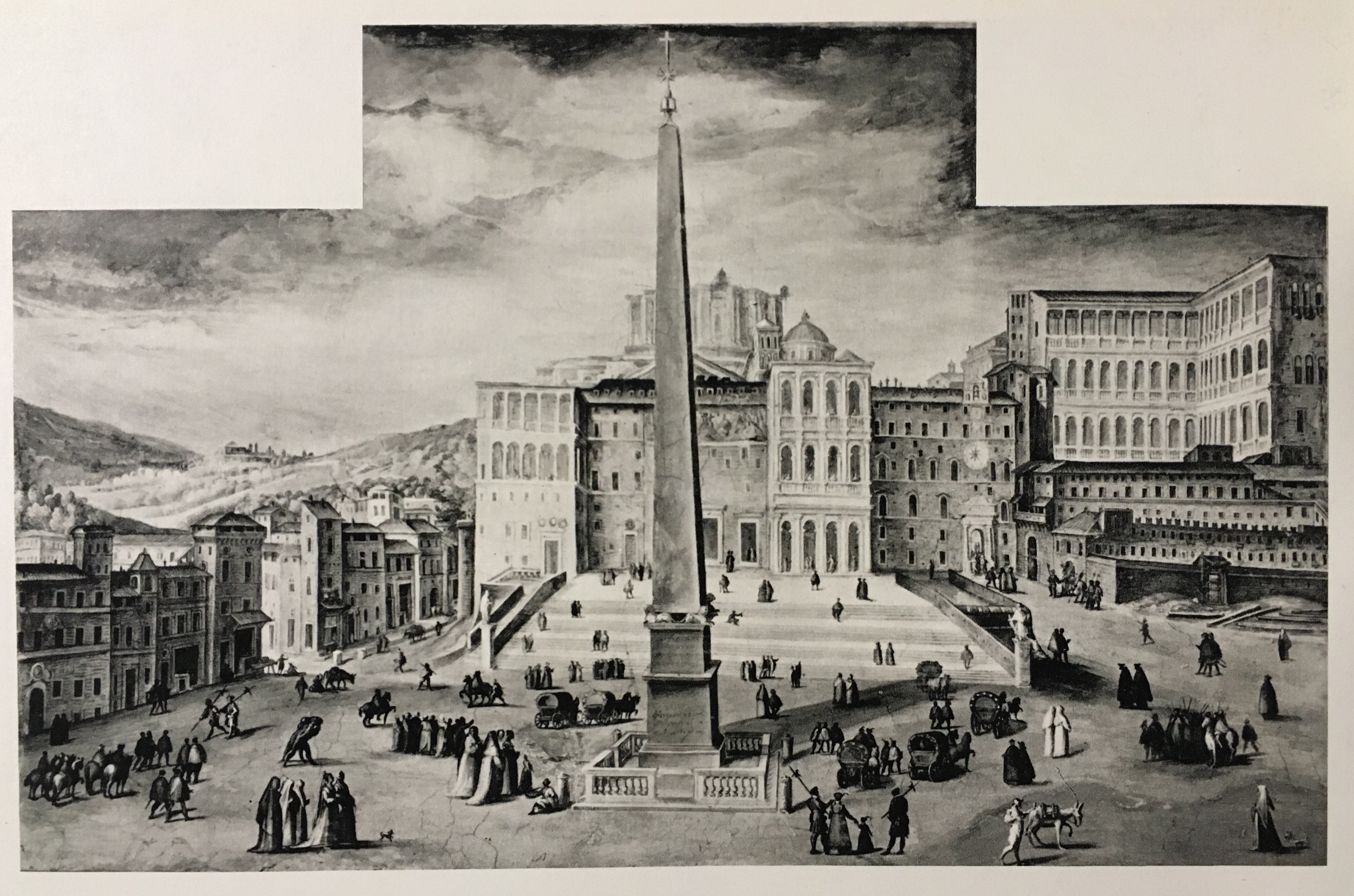
Fresco of St. Peter's Square, c. 1587, before the dome of the new St. Peter's Basilica or the façade had been built

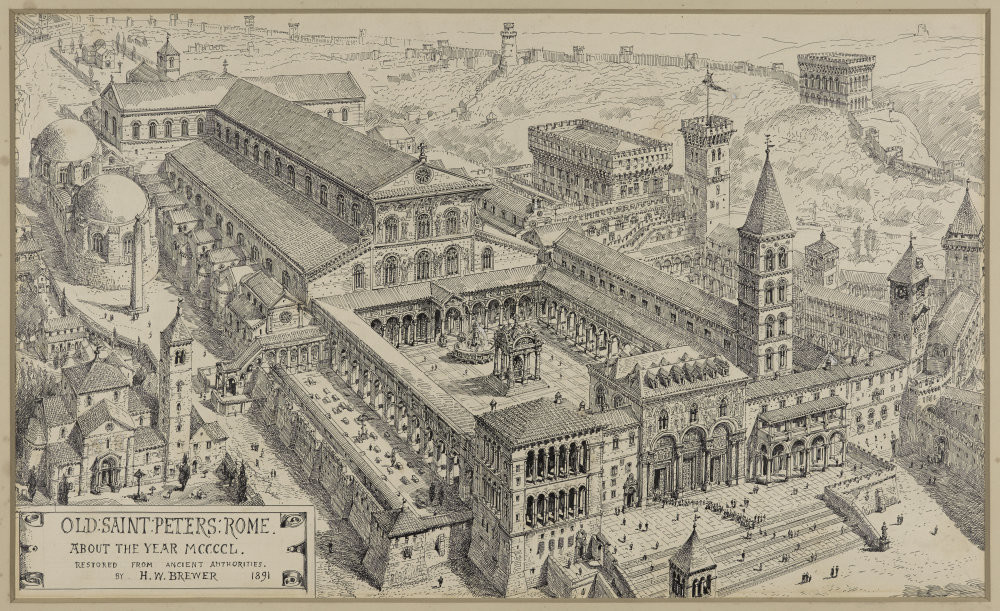
A reconstruction of Old Saint Peter's in 1450; at left is the obelisk in its previous location

The Basilica of St. Peter in 1593, before the construction of the square.

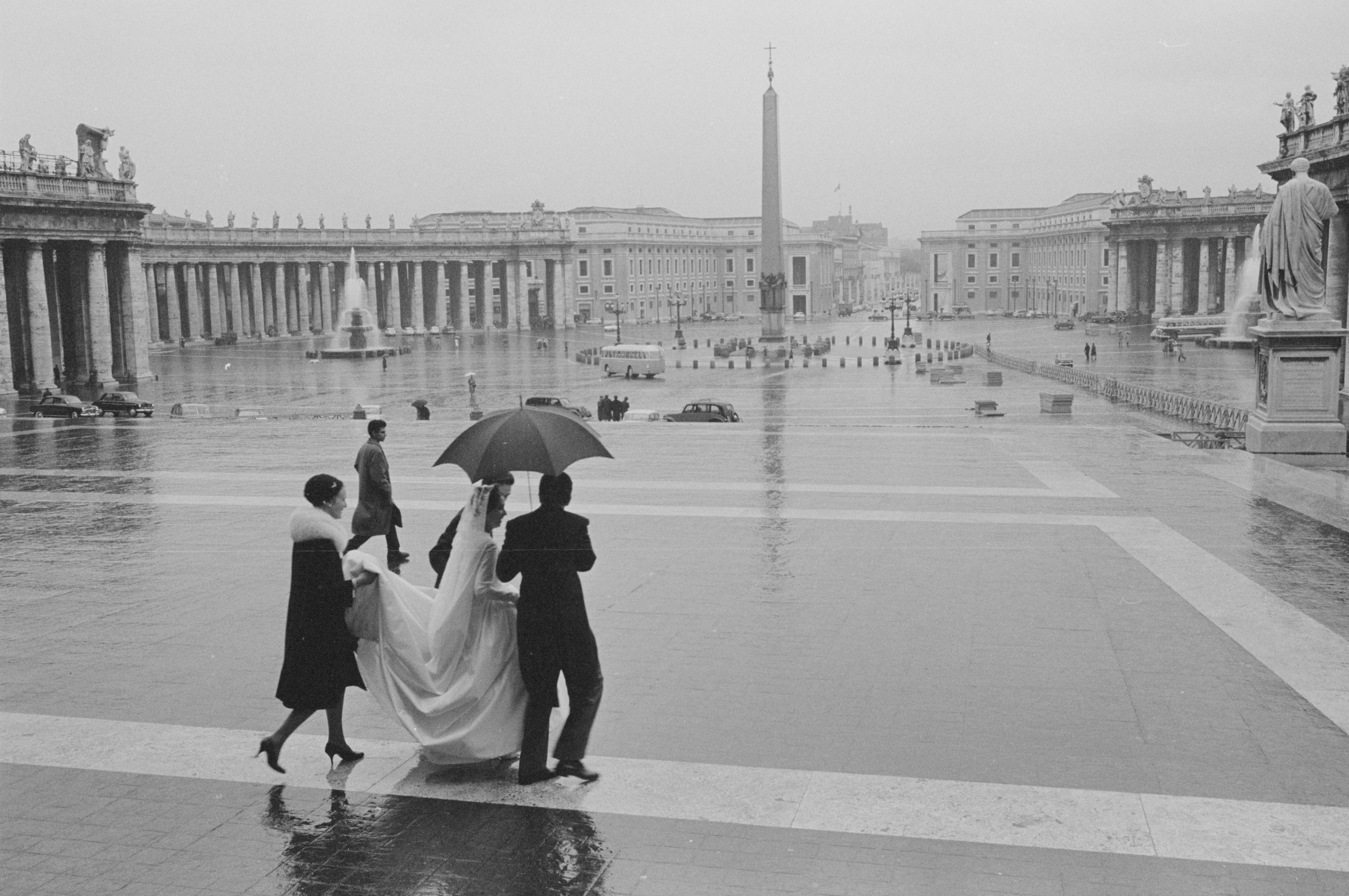
St. Peter's Square in 1959

The open space which lies before the basilica was redesigned by Gian Lorenzo Bernini from 1667 to 1676, under the direction of Pope Alexander VII, as an appropriate forecourt, designed "so that the greatest number of people could see the Pope give his blessing, either from the middle of the façade of the church or from a window in the Vatican Palace". Bernini had been working on the interior of St. Peter's for decades; now he gave order to the space with his renowned colonnades, using a Tuscan order, to avoid competing with the palace-like façade by Carlo Maderno, but he employed it on an unprecedented colossal scale to suit the space and evoke a sense of awe.

There were many constraints from existing structures (illustration, right). The massed accretions of the Vatican Palace crowded the space to the right of the basilica's façade; the structures needed to be masked without obscuring the papal apartments. The Vatican obelisk marked a centre, and a granite fountain by Maderno stood to one side: Bernini made the fountain appear to be one of the foci of the ovato tondo embraced by his colonnades. In architecture, an "ovato tondo" is an oval shape that is also circular. It is often used to create a large, enclosed space with an oval shape. In 1675, Bernini eventually matched Maderno's fountain on the other side just five years before his death. The trapezoidal shape of the piazza, which creates a heightened perspective for a visitor leaving the basilica and has been praised as a masterstroke of Baroque theater (illustration, below right), is largely a product of site constraints.

According to the Lateran Treaty the area of St. Peter's Square up to the foot of the steps leading to the Basilica, is subject to the authority of Italian police for crowd control even though it is a part of the Vatican state; however, Article 3 states that when the Holy See intends to hold particular functions, Italian authorities must withdraw beyond the outer lines of the colonnades. This makes St. Peter's Square one of the few places to be, on an ordinary day, subject to the police authority of two countries; i.e. The Vatican Gendarmerie (Vatican police) and the Italian police.

=== Colonnades ===
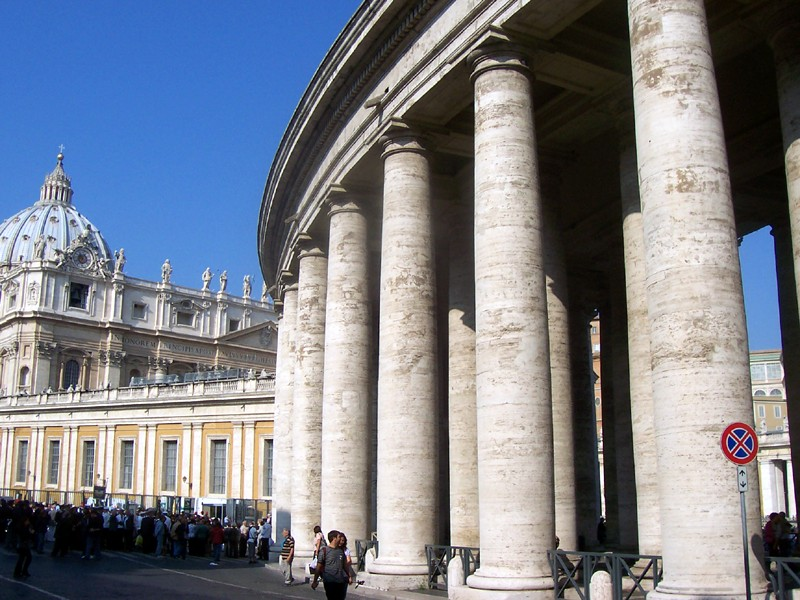
St. Peter's Square colonnades

The colossal Tuscan colonnades, four columns deep, frame the trapezoidal entrance to the basilica and the massive elliptical area which precedes it. The ovato tondo's long axis, parallel to the basilica's façade, creates a pause in the sequence of forward movements that is characteristic of a Baroque monumental approach. The colonnades define the piazza. The elliptical center of the piazza, which contrasts with the trapezoidal entrance, encloses the visitor with "the maternal arms of Mother Church" in Bernini's expression. On the south side, the colonnades define and formalize the space, with the Barberini Gardens still rising to a skyline of umbrella pines. On the north side, the colonnade masks an assortment of Vatican structures; the upper stories of the Vatican Palace rise above.

=== Obelisk ===
At the center of the ovato tondo stands the Vatican obelisk, an uninscribed Egyptian obelisk of red granite, 25.5 m (84 ft) tall, supported on bronze lions and surmounted by the Chigi arms in bronze, in all 41 m (135 ft) to the cross on its top. The obelisk was originally erected in Heliopolis, Egypt, by an unknown pharaoh.

The Emperor Augustus had the obelisk moved to the Julian Forum of Alexandria, where it stood until AD 37, when Caligula ordered the forum demolished and the obelisk transferred to Rome. He had it placed on the spina which ran along the center of the Circus of Nero. It was moved to its current site in 1586 by the engineer-architect Domenico Fontana under the direction of Pope Sixtus V; the engineering feat of re-erecting its vast weight was memorialized in a suite of engravings. The obelisk is the only obelisk in Rome that has not toppled since antiquity. During the Middle Ages, the gilt ball atop the obelisk was believed to contain the ashes of Julius Caesar. Fontana later removed the ancient metal ball, now in a Roman museum, and found only dust inside; Christopher Hibbert, however, writes that the ball was found to be solid. Though Bernini had no influence in the erection of the obelisk, he did use it as the centerpiece of his magnificent piazza, and added the Chigi arms to the top in honor of his patron, Alexander VII.

=== Paving ===
The paving is varied by radiating lines in travertine, to relieve what might otherwise be a sea of setts. In 1817 circular stones were set to mark the tip of the obelisk's shadow at noon as the sun entered each of the signs of the zodiac, making the obelisk a gigantic sundial's gnomon.

=== Spina ===
St. Peter's Square today can be reached from the Ponte Sant'Angelo along the grand approach of the Via della Conciliazione (in honor of the Lateran Treaty of 1929). The spina (median with buildings which divided the two roads of Borgo Vecchio and Borgo nuovo) which once occupied this grand avenue leading to the square was demolished ceremonially by Benito Mussolini himself on October 23, 1936, and was completely demolished by October 8, 1937, creating a long, wide vista from Castel Sant'Angelo to St. Peter's Basilica. After the spina, almost all the buildings south of the passetto were demolished between 1937 and 1950. This obliterated an important medieval and renaissance quarter of the city. Moreover, the demolition of the spina erased the characteristically Baroque surprise of suddenly moving from a confined space to a much larger one; visitors today still get this effect when entering from Borgo Santo Spirito. The Via della Conciliazione was completed in time for the Great Jubilee of 1950.

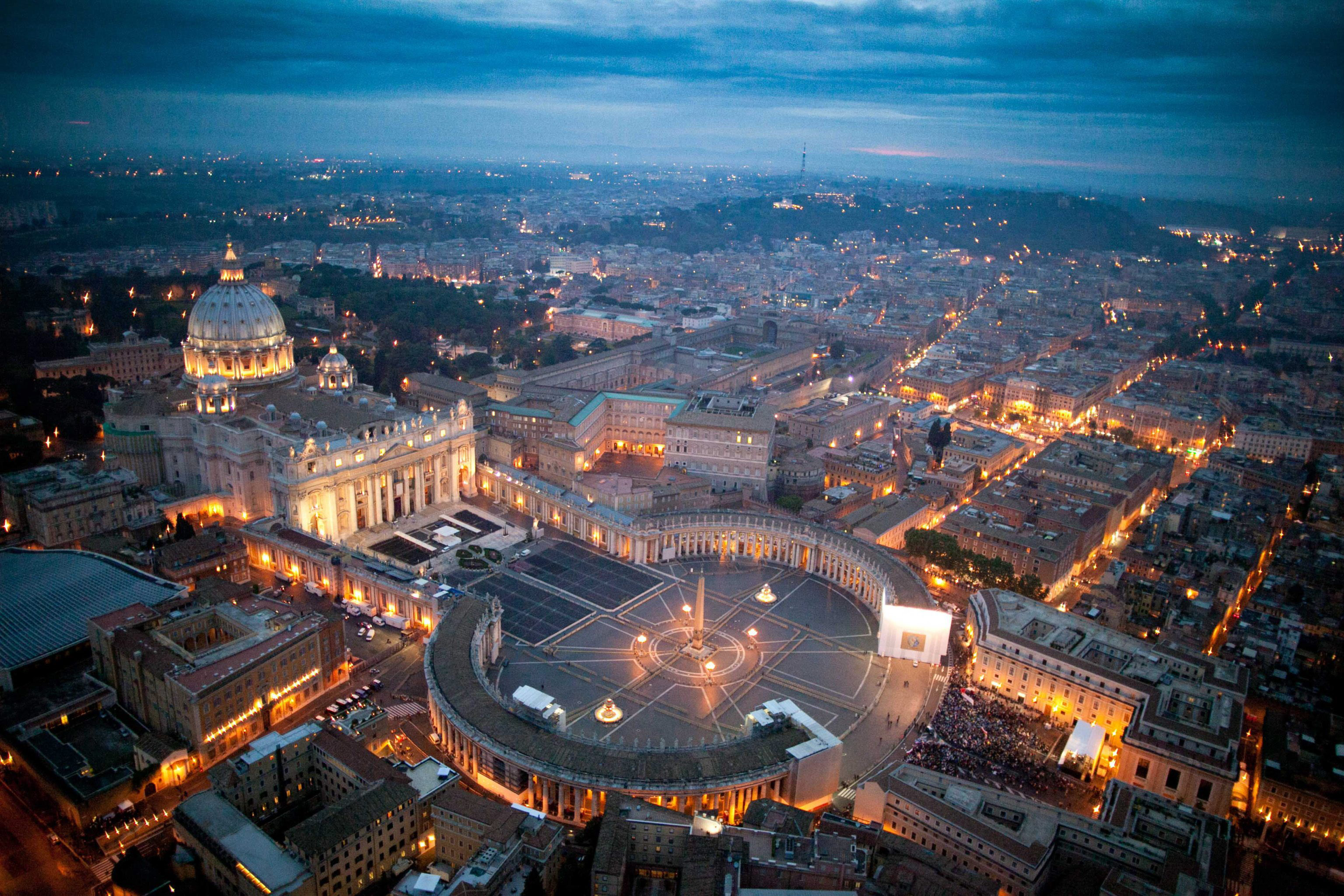
Evening aerial view of the piazza and basilica

== See also ==
- Index of Vatican City–related articles
- List of works by Gian Lorenzo Bernini
