= House of Febo Brigotti =

Coordinates: 41.9029°N 12.4598°E

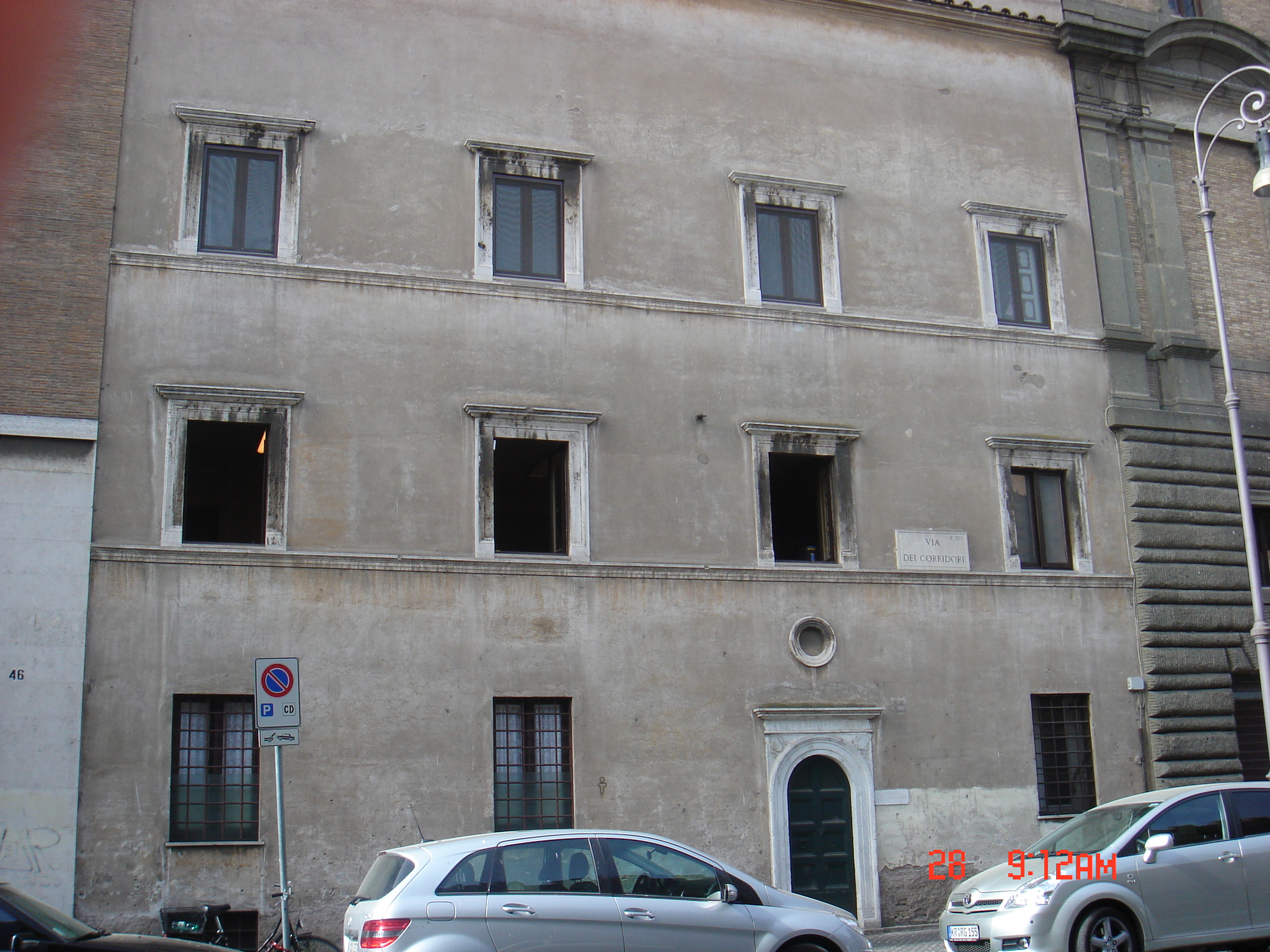
The reconstructed house of Febo Brigotti

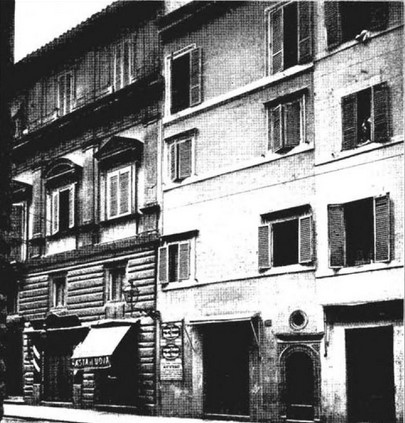
The original house along Borgo Nuovo

The House di Febo Brigotti (Italian: Casa di Febo Brigotti) is a Renaissance house located on Via dei Corridori 44, in the Borgo rione of Rome.

== History ==
Originally located in Borgo Nuovo 106-107, it was the residence of Febo Brigotti, a physician in the service of Pope Paul III (but according to Ludwig von Pastor of Pope Leo X) in the first half of the 16th century. On Borgo Nuovo the house, which had been erected before the construction of Borgo Nuovo in 1499, bordered to the west the Palazzo Jacopo da Brescia. The current building is a reconstruction of the original, demolished along with the rest of the Spina di Borgo in the 1930s during the works for the opening of Via della Conciliazione.

== Architecture ==
The reconstructed facade, attached to the back of the Palazzo Rusticucci-Accoramboni, has a design with simple rectangular windows with an arched portal framed in travertine with an inscription revealing the owner's motto, "OB FIDEM ET CHLIENTELA" ("Due to the faith and the customers"). The original building had also another inscription above the epistyle, "PHOEBUS BRIGOCTUS MEDICUS".

== Sources ==
- Gigli, Laura (1992). Guide rionali di Roma (in Italian). Vol. Borgo (II). Roma: Fratelli Palombi Editori. ISSN 0393-2710.
