= Borgo Nuovo (Rome) =

Former road in Rome

- Via Alessandrina
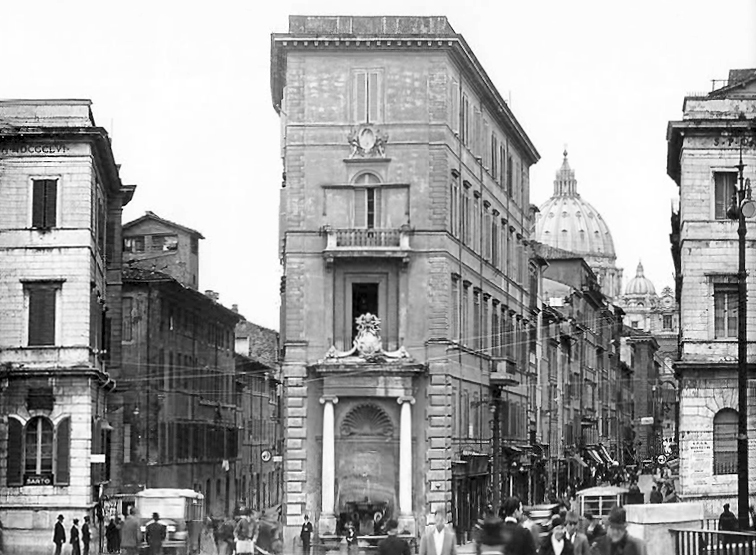
- The east entrance to Borgo in the 1930s. Borgo nuovo is the road to the right of the building adorned with the wall fountain (Palazzo Sauve)

- Location within Rome
- Former name: Via Pontificum; Via Recta
- Location: Rome, Italy
- Quarter: Borgo
- Coordinates: 41.9025°N 12.46211°E
- East end: Piazza Pia
- West end: Piazza Rusticucci

Construction
- Commissioned: 20 February 1499
- Completion: 24 December 1499
- Demolished: 1936–1940

Other
- Designer: Antonio da Sangallo the Elder; Giuliano da Sangallo

Borgo Nuovo, originally known as via Alessandrina, also named via Recta or via Pontificum, was a road in the city of Rome, Italy, important for historical and architectural reasons. Built by Pope Alexander VI Borgia (r. 1492–1503) for the holy year of 1500, the road became one of the main centers of the high Renaissance in Rome. Borgo Nuovo was demolished together with the surrounding quarter in 1936–37 due to the construction of Via della Conciliazione.

== Location ==
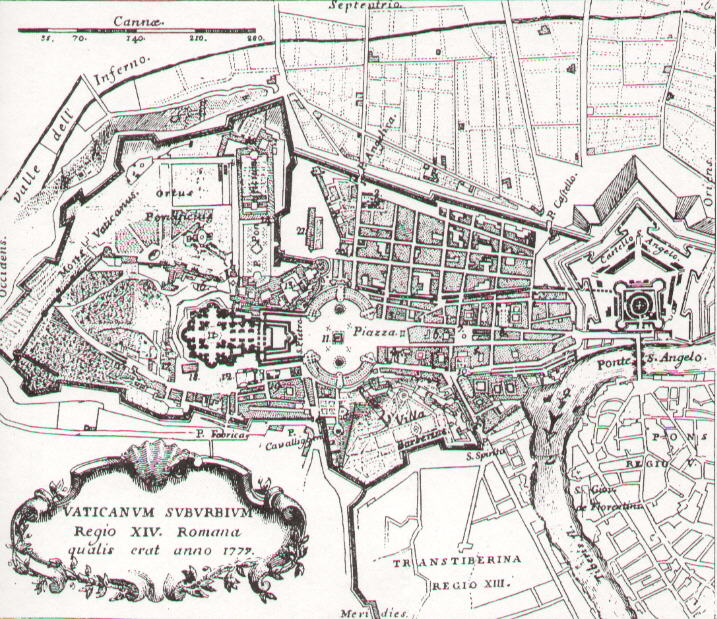
Borgo in 1779 (Map printed by Monaldini). Borgo Nuovo is the third road from the south among the seven that radiate from the Castle.

Located in the Borgo rione, the straight road stretched in E–W direction, between Piazza Pia, which marks the entrance of the quarter near the right bank of the Tiber, and the north edge of Piazza Rusticucci, which until its demolition was the vestibule of Saint Peter's Square. At about two thirds of its length, Borgo Nuovo crossed Piazza Scossacavalli, the center of the Borgo. Together with the nearby road of Borgo Vecchio, of probable Roman origin, Borgo Nuovo delimited the so–called spina (the name derives from its resemblance with the median strip of a Roman circus), composed of several blocks elongated in E–W direction between the castle and Saint Peter.

== Naming ==
The road was named Via Alexandrina, Via Pontificum or Via Recta, later Borgo Nuovo. The first denomination came from Pope Alexander VI who erected it; the second because it became the first part of the Via Papalis, the road that the new pope had to ride to reach St. John; the third ("straight road") from its layout, a rarity in Rome at that time; the fourth was chosen in accordance with the nearby road of Borgo Vecchio.

The name Via Alessandrina fell into disuse after 1570, when Cardinal Michele Bonelli, nicknamed "Cardinal Alessandrino" from his hometown in Piedmont, opened the road in the Monti rione which took its name from him.

== History ==
=== Renaissance ===
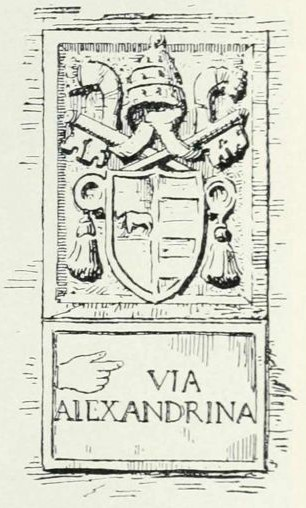
Drawing of a plate originally on the facade of Palazzo dei Convertendi in Borgo Nuovo, with the coat of arms of Alexander VI and the indication "Via Alexandrina"; possibly the first street plate in Rome.

In the mid–15th century, at the beginning of the Renaissance, the connection between Rome and Saint Peter were secured by two ancient roads, Borgo Vecchio and Borgo Santo Spirito, both linking the Castle to the square in front of Old Saint Peter's Basilica. To raise the traffic capacity, another road leading to Saint Peter from Ponte Sant'Angelo was built by Pope Sixtus IV (r. 1471–84) for the holy year of 1475: Borgo Sant'Angelo, also known from his founder as via Sistina. This path ran just south of the Passetto (the covered passage linking the Vatican with the Castle); anyway, also this road was not sufficient to solve the traffic problem. At the end of the 15th century, Alexander VI, whose power was at the time contested by several of the noble Roman families and by French king Charles VIII (r. 1483–98) (who in 1494 had occupied the city, while the pope remained barricaded in the Castel Sant'Angelo), decided to restructure the citadel of Borgo and the castle. In this context, Castel Sant'Angelo assumed the role of hinge between the city and the citadel, and the need arose to build a straight road between the castle and the Apostolic Palace on the Vatican Hill. During the last two Jubilees, which had taken place in 1450 and 1475, the enormous inflow of pilgrims had caused several traffic problems in the Borgo; because of that, in order to solve the problem, during the papal consistory of 16 November 1498 the pope gave the task to rationalize the paths which led to St. Peter, asking Cardinal Girolamo Riario to take the lead and consult experts. On 20 February 1499 the pope asked Riario:

...ut a magistris viarum et architectis quantum foret impense ad dirigendam viam a Porta Castri ad Palatium usque intelligent ac sibi postea referret.

... that they should take note of, and afterwards report to him, the cost incurred by roadbuilders and architects in making a road from the Castle Gate to the Palace.

North of Borgo Vecchio a winding lane run between houses, gardens and ancient walls; At about one third of its length (coming from the Tiber), the path was blocked by a large Roman funerary monument, the Meta Romuli, considered as the resting place of the mythical first king of the city. This was a pyramid similar to that of Cestius, still existing near Porta Ostiense and regarded by the Romans of that time as the graveyard of Remus. Riario, with the technical advice of several architects (among them Antonio da Sangallo the Elder and Giuliano da Sangallo) decided to rectify this lane and a new road, the Via Alexandrina or Recta, was opened after an intense work six months long, started in April 1499. Giovanni Burcardo (Johannes Burckardt from Strassburg, Master of Ceremonies of the pope), records in this way in the Liber Notarum (his diary) on 24 December 1499 the opening of the new road:

Hodie peracto prandio completa est ruptura vie nove recta a parte Castri Santi Angeli ad portam Palatii Apostolici et per eas venerunt omnes cardinales

"Today after lunch was completed the opening of the new straight road between Castel Sant'Angelo and the gate of the Apostolic Palace, and through it all the cardinals came"

On that day the pope ordered the Carriera Sancta (the future Borgo Vecchio) to be closed off, so as to force the traffic along the newly inaugurated route. The road connected the Castle's gate with the gate of the Apostolic palace; unlike the near Borgo Vecchio, it was not a processional path, but a direct link between Castrum and Palatium, parallel to the Passetto, the covered passage which allowed the pope to escape to the castle in case of danger, and that would have been used few years later by pope Clement VII (r. 1523–34) escaping in night robe after Frundsberg's Landsknechts. The design of the road was completed with the opening in Vatican of a new gate, the "Porta Santa" which was going to substitute the "Porta Aurea" of St. John in Lateran; this gate allowed the pilgrims coming from Borgo Nuovo to meet at once the "Altare della Veronica", the most venerated relic of the Christianity. In this way, the Via Alessandrina became the first straight with a backdrop in Rome, a model that would find application under Pope Julius II (r. 1503–13) with Via Giulia and almost a century later especially with Sixtus V (r. 1585–90).

The completion of the Via Alessandrina required the demolition of several ancient buildings: among them, the Meta Romuli, linked to the traditions about the tomb of Saint Peter. The new road became the first tract of the Via Papalis, the road that each pope rode on the back of a mule during the "Cavalcata del possesso" ("Possession ride"), the ride between Saint Peter and Saint John immediately after his election to take ownership of his office of Rome's bishop. It was also used for popular happenings as horses, buffaloes, donkeys or men races, all favorite entertainments of the Borgia pope; because of that, Borgo Nuovo remained unpaved until before 1509, during the papacy of Julius II.

In order to finance the construction, the owners of already existing houses were subjected to pay a special tax, since the new road would have increased the value of their real estate; the rest of the expenses had to be paid by the magistri viarum (the officers in charge with the road maintenance). On the other side, in order to develop the road's surroundings, people willing to erect buildings at least 5 canne (11 m (36 ft) ca.) high along the new road received special privileges, such as tax exemptions.

Cardinals, noble families and rich bourgeois made use of this opportunity, erecting palaces and houses, designed in the new classicist style of Antonio da Sangallo the Elder and Donato Bramante, two among the architects involved in the road's design, and Borgo Nuovo became soon one of the most fashionable roads of the city. During the Renaissance many among the new houses of the quarter were decorated with paintings (fresco and graffito). As of today, the only surviving decorated house in the Borgo is the one along Vicolo del Campanile, a former side lane of Borgo Nuovo.

The work on the road continued under the direction of Antonio da Sangallo the Elder also with Pope Leo X (r. 1513–21), who financed it with the huge sum of 1,444 ducati.

=== Baroque and Modern Age ===
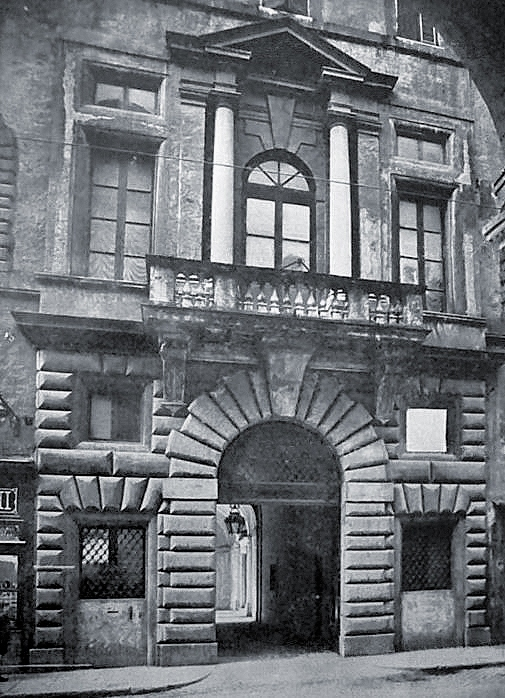
Portal of the palazzo dei Convertendi along Borgo Nuovo, 1930 ca.

During the reign of Pope Alexander VII (r. 1655–67), in the context of the construction of St. Peter's Square Gian Lorenzo Bernini integrated Borgo Nuovo in the project of the new square. The optical axis given by Borgo Nuovo was overturned with respect to the axis of the Basilica, defined by the obelisk of the circus of Caligola erected in 1595 by Domenico Fontana before the center of the facade of the ancient basilica; this effect was obtained by creating in front of the basilica a symmetrical trapezoidal space through the construction of the two covered paths (corridori). The north corridore of Maderno's St. Peter's façade, leading to the Scala Regia, was considered by Bernini as a covered prosecution of the road: the right arm of the colonnade stops just before the axis of the road in order to not interrupt the line of sight between the road and the northern corridore. In this way, the main axis of Borgo turns into the secondary axis of Saint Peter's Square, and is duplicated for reasons of symmetry by building the southern corridore. Around 1660, after the construction of the colonnade of Bernini, the first block of the spina between Borgo Vecchio and Borgo Nuovo, named isola del Priorato after the building hosting the Priory of the Knights of Rhodes, was pulled down by Bernini in order to create a space–the Piazza Rusticucci–which allowed the full view of Saint Peter's dome, hidden by Maderno's nave. Because of that Borgo Nuovo was deprived of its western end.

At the beginning of the 19th century, when Rome was part of the First French Empire, the prefect of the city, de Tournon, included in his program of urban renewal the demolition of the spina, and thus of Borgo Nuovo. Anyway, at the fall of Napoleon only the first three houses at the east end of the road had been demolished; after the comeback of the pope the previous situation was restored. At the east end of the spina between Borgo Vecchio and Borgo Nuovo, in 1850 a new building, palazzo Sauve, was erected; this replaced a house which had been pulled down during the Roman Republic of 1849. On the east façade of the building a large fountain, the "Fontana dei Delfini" ("Dolphins' Fountain") was erected by Pope Pius IX (r. 1846–78) in 1861, marking the beginning of the "spina". The palace was demolished in 1936 and the fountain was moved to the Vatican City in 1958.

In 1858 at the beginning of the Borghi Pius IX let build by Luigi Poletti two twin buildings that–together with the dolphins' fountain–provided a scenic entrance to the Leonine city.

During all this period, and until its demolition, Borgo Nuovo was a prestigious, touristic and busy road, unlike the nearby Borgo Vecchio, which was secluded, familiar and simple.

=== Demolition ===
Between 1934 and 1936, when the project of Via della Conciliazione was developed, architects Marcello Piacentini and Attilio Spaccarelli chose to give to the new road the alignment of the nearby Borgo Vecchio road, and not of Borgo Nuovo. This resolution, made because both of reasons of perspective and to avoid the demolition of the Palazzo dei Penitenzieri (facing the south side of Piazza Scossacavalli and parallel to the south side of Borgo Vecchio) caused the destruction of almost all the houses and the palaces of the road. The spina, with the whole south side of Borgo Nuovo, was demolished between 29 October 1936 and 8 October 1937. On the north side of the road, only the church of Santa Maria in Traspontina, the Palazzo Torlonia in Piazza Scossacavalli and palazzo Latmiral, an undistinguished 19th century building lying between them, were spared. To mask the different alignment of the 3 surviving edifices with respect both to the new adjacent blocks and to those along the south side of the new road (which were aligned with Borgo Vecchio), a double row of obelisks surmounted by lanterns were put in place; the Romans wittily nicknamed them "le supposte" ("the suppositories"), noticing that Via della Conciliazione looked now like the monumental entrance to a cemetery.

== Notable buildings and landmarks ==
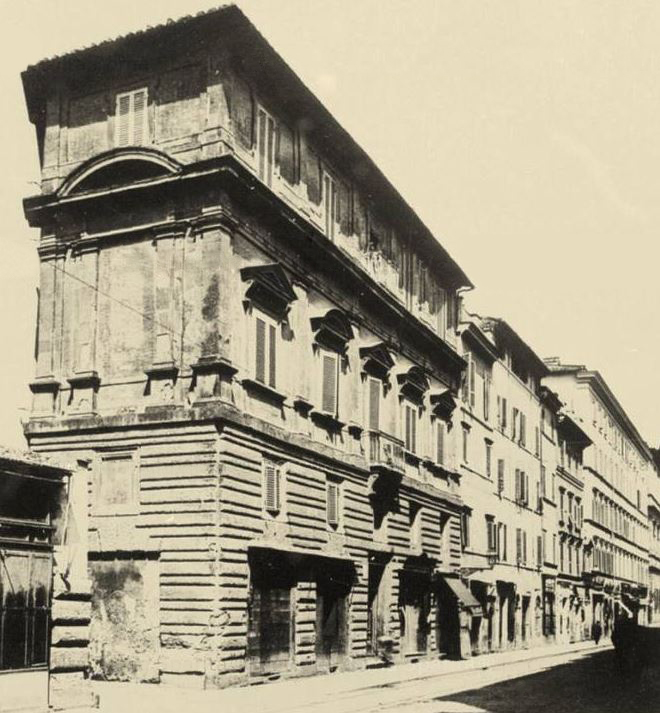
Partial view of the north side of Borgo Nuovo, with the Palazzo Jacopo da Brescia in foreground, 1930 ca.

At the entrance of Borgo Nuovo, on the northern side, and facing on the opposite side Vicolo del Villano, lay one of the two twin palaces built by Luigi Poletti. They have the same late neoclassical style as the Manifattura dei Tabacchi ("Tobaccos factory") in piazza Mastai in Trastevere, erected by Antonio Sarti a few years later.

At the east end of the spina between Borgo Vecchio and Borgo Nuovo, in 1850 a new building, palazzo Sauve, was erected; this replaced a house which had been pulled down during the Roman Republic. On the east façade of the building a large fountain, the "Fontana dei Delfini" ("Dolphins' Fountain") was erected by pope Pius IX in 1861, marking the beginning of the "Spina". The palace was demolished in 1936 and the fountain was moved in the Vatican City in 1958.

Coming from the east end of the road, on the south side, at n. 29–30, there was a little chapel erected by Pius VI (r. 1775–99) in 1796, closed by a gate and surmounted by the Pope's coat of arms and an epigraph. It housed a charcoal–drawn Madonna col Figlio Morto ("Madonna with dead Son"), originally placed on a wall in the Vicolo della Fontanella (a covered passage between Borgo Vecchio and Borgo Nuovo). Against the figure of the virgin a drunkard a few years earlier had thrown a slice of melon, whose seeds had remained attached to the rays drawn above Mary's forehead. The Madonna, called after that "of the melon" or "of the seed" was positioned in a golden frame held by angels in stucco.

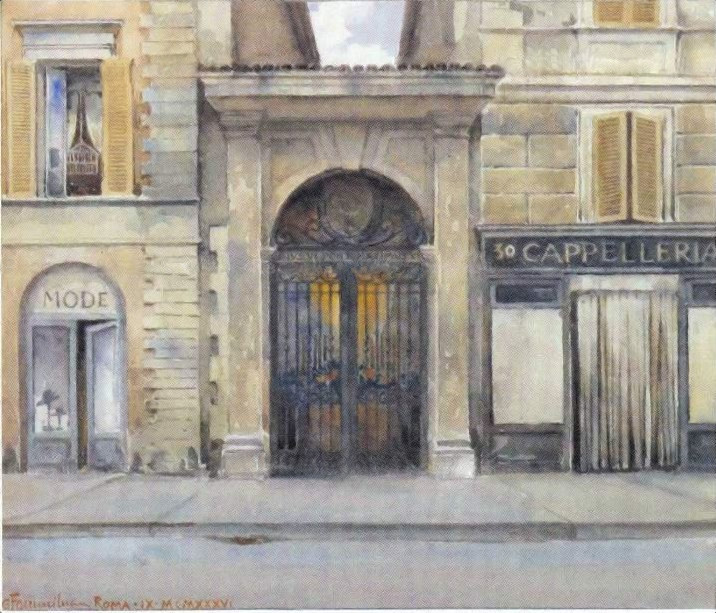
Chapel of the Madonna del Melone in a watercolour of Giuseppe Fammilume painted in October 1936, shortly before its demolition

Next to the chapel, Pius VI had a small fountain built, consisting of a frame surmounted by an epigraph and his coat of arms; the water poured from a white marble putto's head with his cheeks outstretched because of the effort to channel the jet into a basin. The fountain, very popular in the ward, was nicknamed "del Ricciotto" ("of the curly child") because of the head's curly hair. Subsequently leaned against the front of the Carmelites convent on the opposite side of the road, and long believed to have been lost during the demolition works, the fountain has been found in the municipal storerooms.

Up ahead, on the north side, at the n. 46, Buto, a doctor active during the reign of Paul III, let erect a palazzetto whose façade was adorned with the busts of Galenus and Hippocrates and on the friezes of the three windows at the piano nobile bore the inscription "DEO, PAULO ET LABORIBUS" ("To God, Paul (III) and (my) works"); This building was demolished after 1938.

A new, magnificent church dedicated to the Virgin Mary, Santa Maria in Traspontina ("St. Mary behind the bridge"), was built since 1566 along the N side of Borgo Nuovo, towards the middle of the road, under the direction of Giovanni Sallustio Peruzzi and Ottavio Mascherino. This church substituted the old church bearing the same name, which had to be pulled down in 1564, when Pius IV (r. 1559–65) renewed the castle's ramparts.

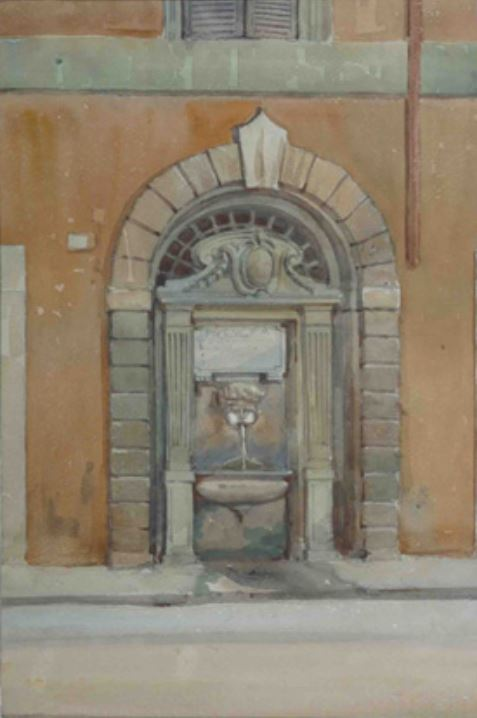
Street fountain of the Ricciotto in a watercolour of Giuseppe Fammilume

The church, which became one of the parishes of the Borgo, was run by the Carmelites, which lived in a monastery placed to the east of the shrine; to the right side of Santa Maria was erected an Oratory devoted to the Christian doctrine, built in 1714–15. While the monastery was pulled down in 1939, church and oratory exist still today along Via della Conciliazione.

In front of the Traspontina, Antonio da Sangallo the younger erected between Borgo Vecchio and Borgo Nuovo the Palazzo del Governatore di Borgo ("Borgo's governor palace"), originally designed as home of apostolic Protonotary Giovanni dal Pozzo; after being converted into jail, the building decayed. The palace was demolished in 1937, but its portal was reused in a new building erected by Marcello Piacentini at Via della Conciliazione n. 15.

At about one third of its length coming from east, Borgo Nuovo led to the small Piazza Scossacavalli, the center of the rione. In the early 16th century, along three sides of the piazza were erected large palaces, while the fourth hosted the Church of San Giacomo. On the N side, aligned with Borgo Nuovo, Adriano Castellesi, treasurer of Alexander VI and later Cardinal of Corneto (today's Tarquinia), let erect (possibly by Donato Bramante) a palace, which follows the outlines of the Palazzo della Cancelleria. This building, which now belongs to the Torlonia family, has been spared by the demolition of the road and is now part of the north side of Via della Conciliazione.

Between the west side of piazza Scossacavalli and the south side of Borgo Nuovo, the Caprini family from Viterbo let erect by Bramante their Roman residence. The palace was then bought by Raphael, who completed it and spent there the last 3 years of his life, dying there in 1520. Later, the building was enlarged, becoming the Palazzo dei Convertendi. Along Borgo Nuovo the palace had a monumental portal surmounted by a balcony, both designed by Baldassarre Peruzzi; the latter was considered the most beautiful in the whole city. The Palazzo dei Convertendi was demolished in 1937 and rebuilt in 1941 west of Palazzo Torlonia with another plan but reusing original elements, included the portal with the balcony.

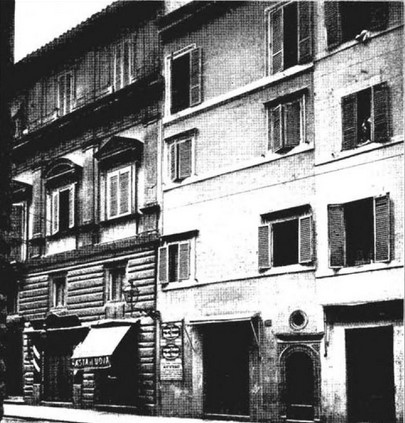
The Palazzo Jacopo da Brescia (left) and the House of Febo Brigotti (next to it on the right)

Some years before the construction of the road, Florentine Cardinal Piero Soderini built in the Borgo a row of seven houses with porch in Tuscan renaissance style; after the road's erection, the houses overlooked its north side. Soderini actually wanted to pull down the block and built a palace by Bramante, but his turbulent life (he was a staunch enemy of the House of Medici, which for his misfortune, during those years arrived to the papacy twice, with Leo X and Clement VII did not allow him to fulfill his plan. The houses survived unscathed until the end of the 19th century, when they were pulled down and substituted with an apartment block with shops at parterre.

After the house of the Soderini, along Borgo Nuovo's north side, lay a small arch, the "Arco della Purità" ("Purity's arch"), leading to a short lane hosting the little church devoted to the Virgin Mary. Santa Maria della Purità was erected here inside the ruins of a house destroyed during the sack of Rome of 1527 to remember a miracle which happened here in 1530; after praying a fresco with the Virgin Mary which had survived on a wall of the ruined house, a woman prayed the Virgin to heal her hand: after the healing, more and more people came here to pray the Virgin and a small church was erected.

Heading west after the arch, Febo Brigotti, a doctor of Pope Paul III (r. 1534–49), let erect at the end of 15th century an elegant two–storey palazzetto at the n. 106–107 of the road; the facade bore two inscription, one above the epistyle, "PHOEBUS BRIGOCTUS MEDICUS", and, on one side, the motto of the doctor: "OB FIDEM ET CHLIENTELA" ("Due to the faith and the customers"). This house was pulled down in 1937, but its prospect has been rebuilt using original materials not far away, in front of the Passetto along via dei Corridori, the road parallel to Via della Conciliazione.

Bordering Brigotti's house, at the n. 163, at the crossing between Borgo Nuovo and Vicolo dell'Elefante ("Elephant's Lane", so named to remember Hanno the elephant, here lodged in the 16th century), Raphael built a palazzetto for Jacopo Bresciano, doctor of Pope Leo X. The building, which had an extraordinary architectural quality, has been demolished and rebuilt with another plan between via Rusticucci and Via dei Corridori, near Brigotti's house.

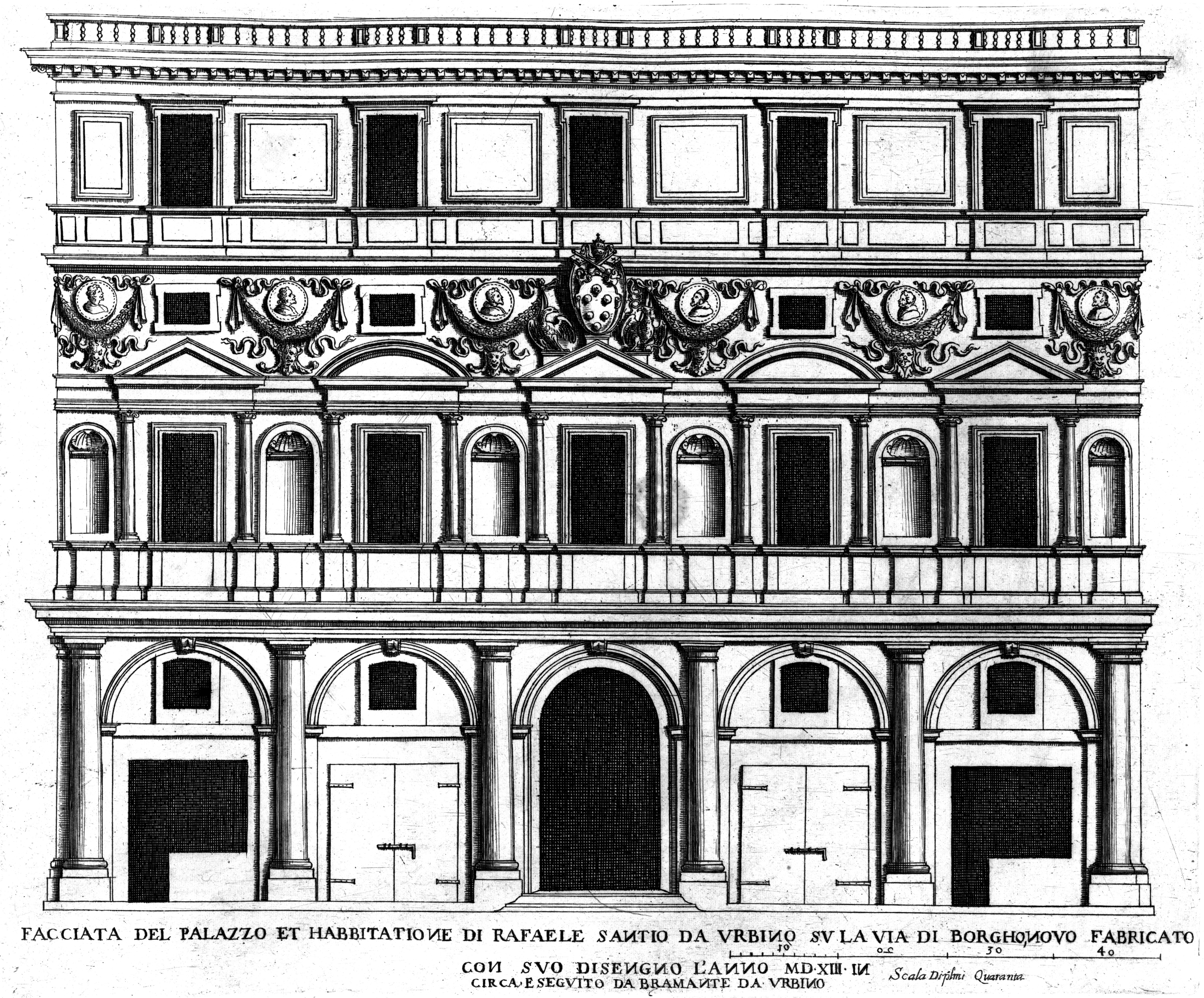
17th century etching of Palazzo Branconio dell'Aquila along Borgo Nuovo.

Beyond the palazzo di Jacopo da Brescia the northern side of the road continued with Palazzo Rusticucci-Accoramboni, a large Renaissance Palace erected by Domenico Fontana and Carlo Maderno on behalf of Cardinal Girolamo Rusticucci; In 1667, the above–mentioned demolition of the first south block of the road in occasion of the erection of St. Peter Square let the palace overlook the new piazza, which took the building's name. The building was demolished in 1940 and rebuilt along the north side of Via della Conciliazione.

The northern side of Borgo Nuovo until the construction of the colonnade of St. Peter's Square ended with a block whose last building on the street was the church of Santa Caterina delle Cavallerotte (or Cavalierotte: so were called in Rome girls from rich and noble families who wanted to become nuns), founded in the 14th century. Demolished in part for the construction of Via Alessandrina, the church was rebuilt in seven months between 1508 and 1509 to a design by Giuliano da Sangallo, and demolished with the whole block for the construction of St. Peter's Square.

The western end of the south side of the street (the aforementioned isola del Priorato) until the creation of St. Peter's Square was instead occupied in part by Palazzo Branconio dell'Aquila, a Renaissance building erected between 1518 and 1520 by Giovanbattista Branconio dell'Aquila, treasurer of Pope Leo X, patron and close friend of Raphael, who drew up the project. The palace, considered at the time of its erection the most beautiful building in Rome, was also demolished in 1667.

== List of notable buildings along the road ==
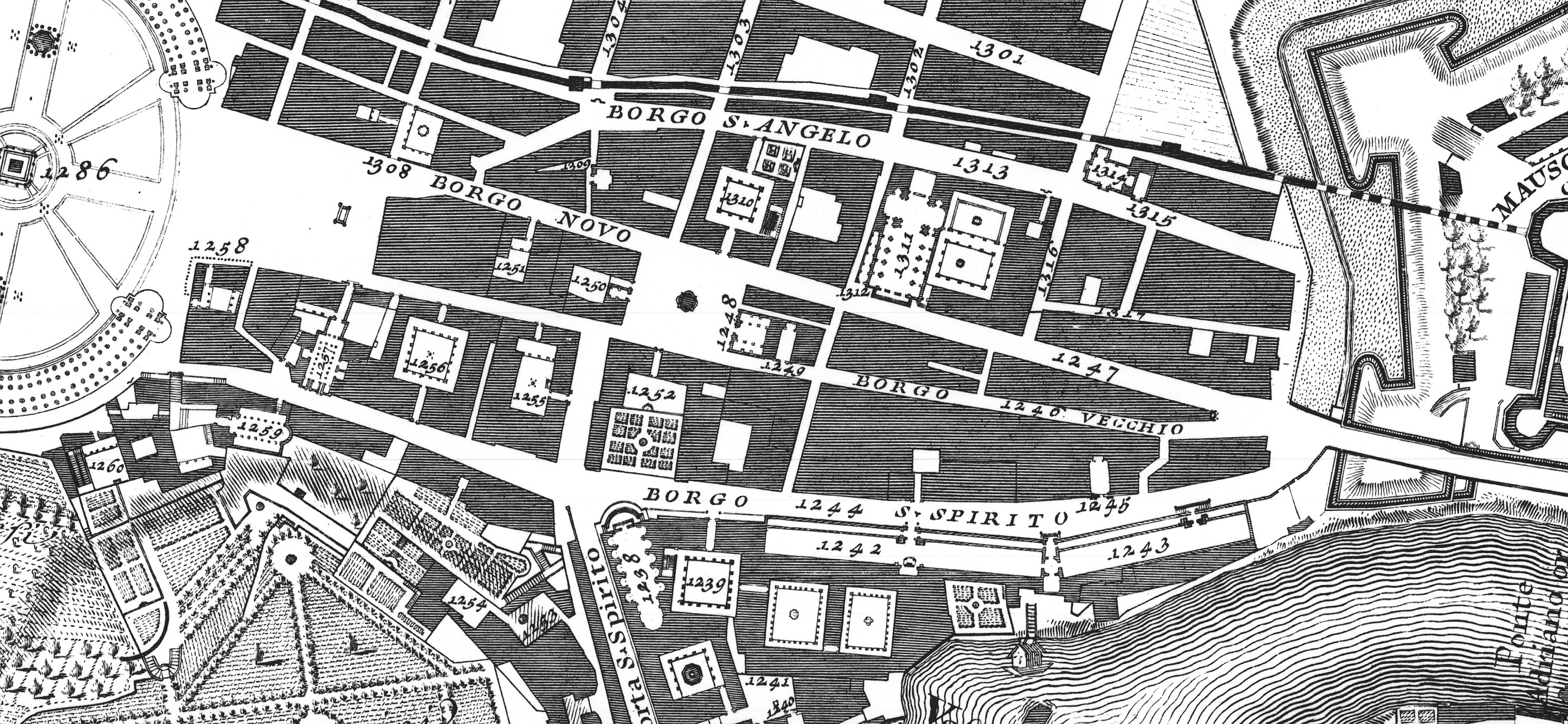
The central part of Borgo with the spina delimited by Borgo Nuovo and Borgo Vecchio in Rome's map of Giambattista Nolli (1748)

- Palazzo Sauve (demolished)
- House of the physician of Paul III (demolished)
- Santa Maria in Traspontina
- Palazzo del Governatore di Borgo (demolished, elements reused)
- Palazzo dei Convertendi (demolished and rebuilt)
- Arco della Purità (demolished)
- House of Febo Brigotti (demolished and rebuilt)
- Palazzo Jacopo da Brescia (demolished and rebuilt)
- Palazzo Branconio dell'Aquila (demolished)
- Santa Caterina delle Cavallerotte (demolished)

== Sources ==
- von Pastor, Ludwig (1916). Die Stadt Rom zu Ende der Renaissance (in German). Freiburg im Breisgau: Herder Verlag. ISBN 9789925056484.
- Borgatti, Mariano (1926). Borgo e S. Pietro nel 1300–1600–1925 (in Italian). Roma: Federico Pustet.
- Ceccarelli, Giuseppe (Ceccarius) (1938). La "Spina" dei Borghi (in Italian). Roma: Danesi.
- Gnoli, Umberto (1939). Topografia e toponomastica di Roma medioevale e moderna (in Italian). Roma: Staderini.
- Castagnoli, Ferdinando; Cecchelli, Carlo; Giovannoni, Gustavo; Zocca, Mario (1958). Topografia e urbanistica di Roma (in Italian). Bologna: Cappelli.
- Portoghesi, Paolo (1970). Roma del Rinascimento (in Italian). Milano: Electa.
- Delli, Sergio (1988). Le strade di Roma (in Italian). Roma: Newton & Compton.
- Gigli, Laura (1990). Guide rionali di Roma (in Italian). Vol. Borgo (I). Roma: Fratelli Palombi Editori. ISSN 0393-2710.
- Gigli, Laura (1992). Guide rionali di Roma (in Italian). Vol. Borgo (II). Roma: Fratelli Palombi Editori. ISSN 0393-2710.
- Cambedda, Anna (1990). La demolizione della Spina dei Borghi (in Italian). Roma: Fratelli Palombi Editori.
- Benevolo, Leonardo (2004). San Pietro e la città di Roma (in Italian). Bari: Laterza. ISBN 8842072362.
- Parisi Presicce, Claudio; Petacco, Laura (2016). "Trasformazioni urbane e memoria collettiva: l'area vaticana, la Spina e Via della Conciliazione". In Claudio Parisi Presicce; Laura Petacco (eds.). La Spina: dall'Agro vaticano a Via della Conciliazione (in Italian). Rome: Gangemi. ISBN 978-88-492-3320-9.
- Fagiolo, Maurizio; Madonna, Maria Luisa (2016). "Lo Sviluppo urbanistico dei Borghi dal 1500 al 1870". In Claudio Parisi Presicce; Laura Petacco (eds.). La Spina: dall'Agro vaticano a Via della Conciliazione (in Italian). Rome: Gangemi. ISBN 978-88-492-3320-9.
- Petacco, Laura (2016). "La Meta Romuli e il Therebintus Neronis". In Claudio Parisi Presicce; Laura Petacco (eds.). La Spina: dall'Agro vaticano a Via della Conciliazione (in Italian). Rome: Gangemi. ISBN 978-88-492-3320-9.
- Federico, Elena (2016). "Il deposito del Bastione Ardeatino a Villa Pepoli". In Claudio Parisi Presicce; Laura Petacco (eds.). La Spina: dall'Agro vaticano a Via della Conciliazione (in Italian). Roma: Gangemi. ISBN 978-88-492-3320-9.
