= Palazzo Branconio dell'Aquila =

Lost building in Rome, Italy

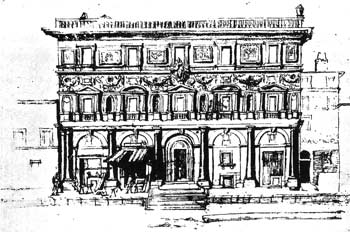
- Sketch of the palazzo by Giambattista Naldini (c. 1560)
- Interactive map of the Palazzo Branconio dell'Aquila area

General information
- Location: Rome, Italy

The Palazzo Branconio dell'Aquila is a lost palace in the rione Borgo of Rome (west of Castel Sant'Angelo), designed by Raphael for Giovanbattista Branconio dell'Aquila, a papal advisor and goldsmith.

It was designed by the Italian artist in his last years of life, around 1520. The palace lay along the Borgo Nuovo road, and was demolished around 1660 together with the adjoining block, named "Isola del Priorato" after the nearby Priory of the Knights of Rhodes, to open a square in front of Saint Peter's Square colonnade, the Piazza Rusticucci.

== See also ==
- Palazzo Jacopo da Brescia

== Sources ==
- Frommel, Ch. L. (2003). "I palazzi di Raffaello: come si abitava a viveva nella Roma del primo Cinquecento". Architettura alla corte papale nel Rinascimento (in Italian). Milan. pp. 240–255.
