= Coupled column =

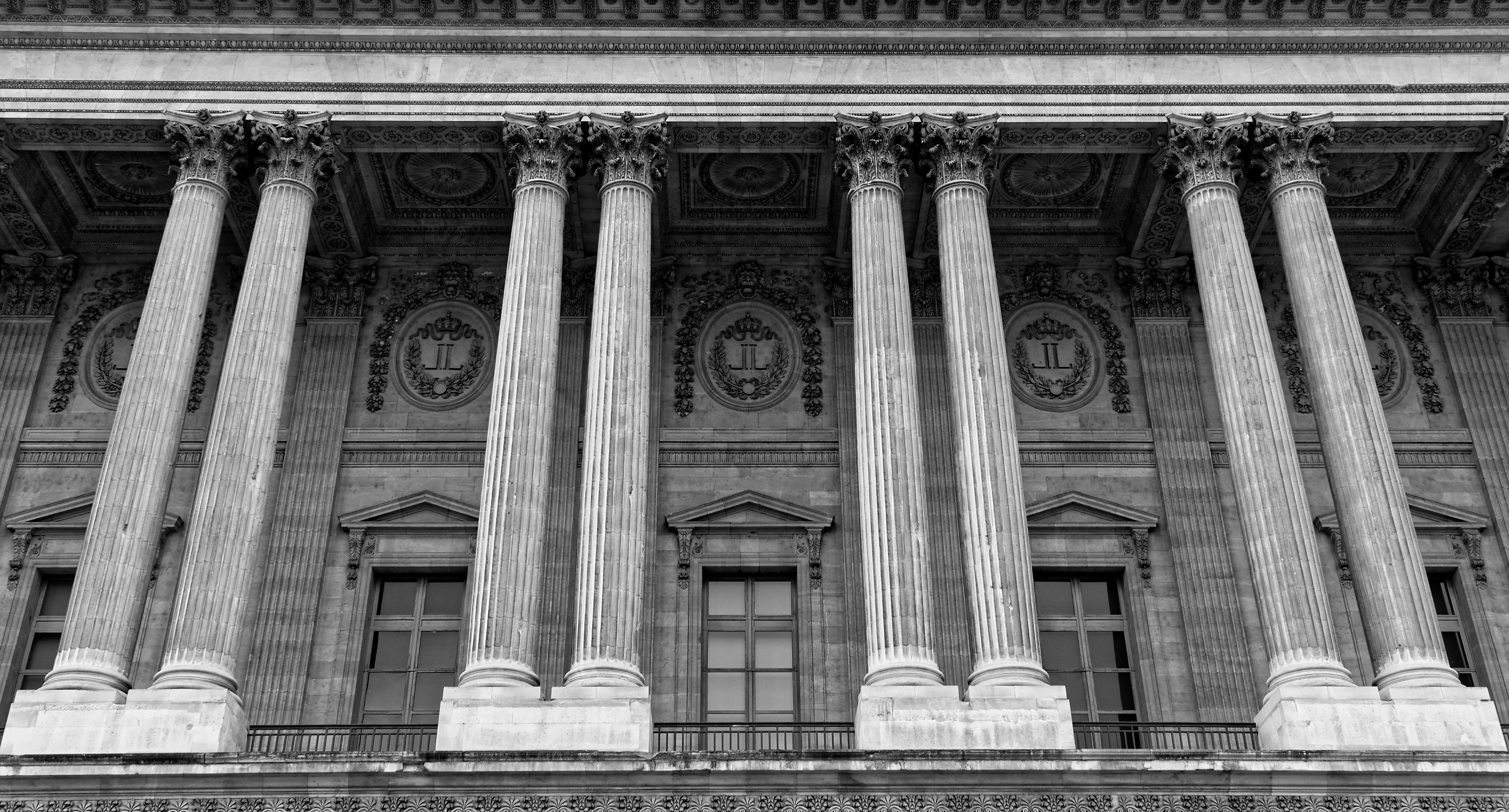
Coupled columns of the Louvre Colonnade

A coupled column (also accouplement, twinned or paired column) is one of a pair of columns that are installed nearer together and wider with others. The coupled columns should be of the same order and set closer enough to almost touch each other at their bases and capitals. These columns were mostly used in the architecture of the 17th century and later. In a colonnade, all columns may be coupled or just the outer pairs. Сoupled columns are often installed at the building entrance, on both sides of a window, fireplace, niche, or stair. Pilasters and engaged columns can also be paired.

== Controversy ==
The coupling of classical columns was both a recurring motif in French classical architecture and a matter of controversy in structural and aesthetic theory. Quatremère de Quincy described the paired columns as a "fault" and a first step to vice (1788). Claude Perrault, in contrast, considered coupled columns to be structurally superior because a composite architrave spanning wide intercolumnation of paired columns rested wholly on the inner column at each end.

== Openings ==
Double bays can also receive this name. Thus a mullioned window is the name of an opening divided into two holes by a mullion or a mullion. It is also sometimes referred to as mullioned arches.

== Gallery ==
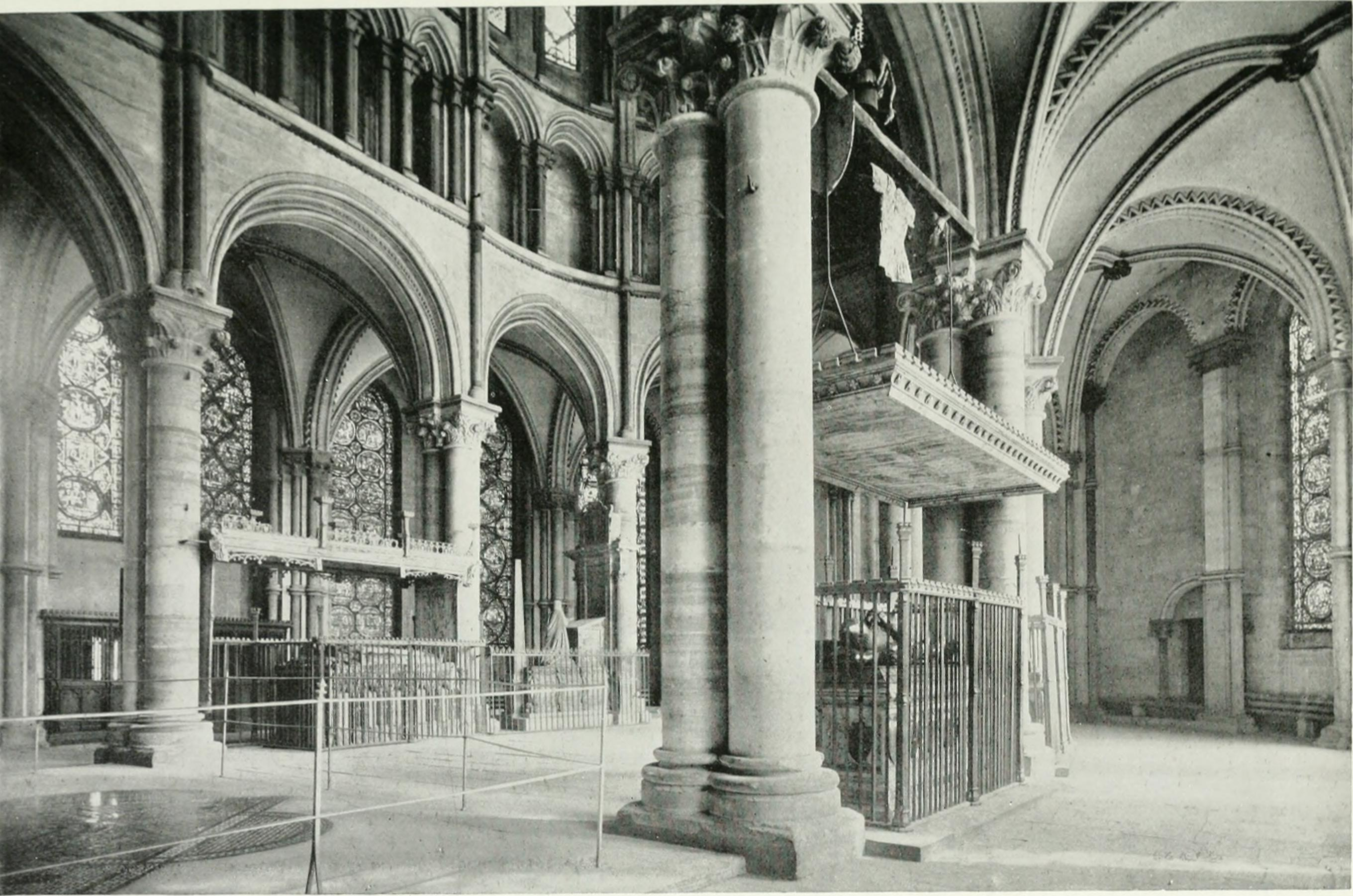
Canterbury Cathedral, Trinity Chapel

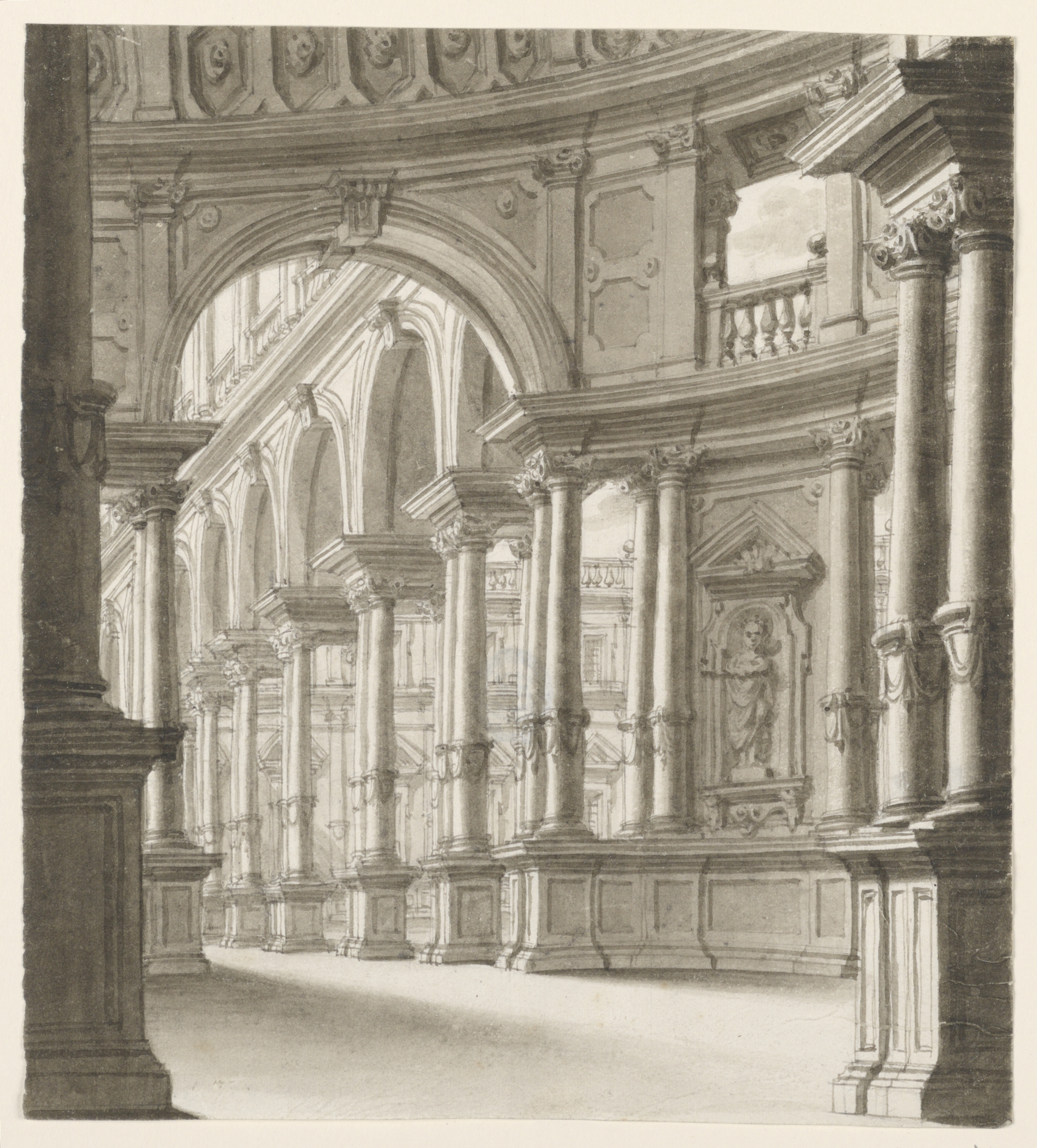
Renaissance style portico with coupled columns in park

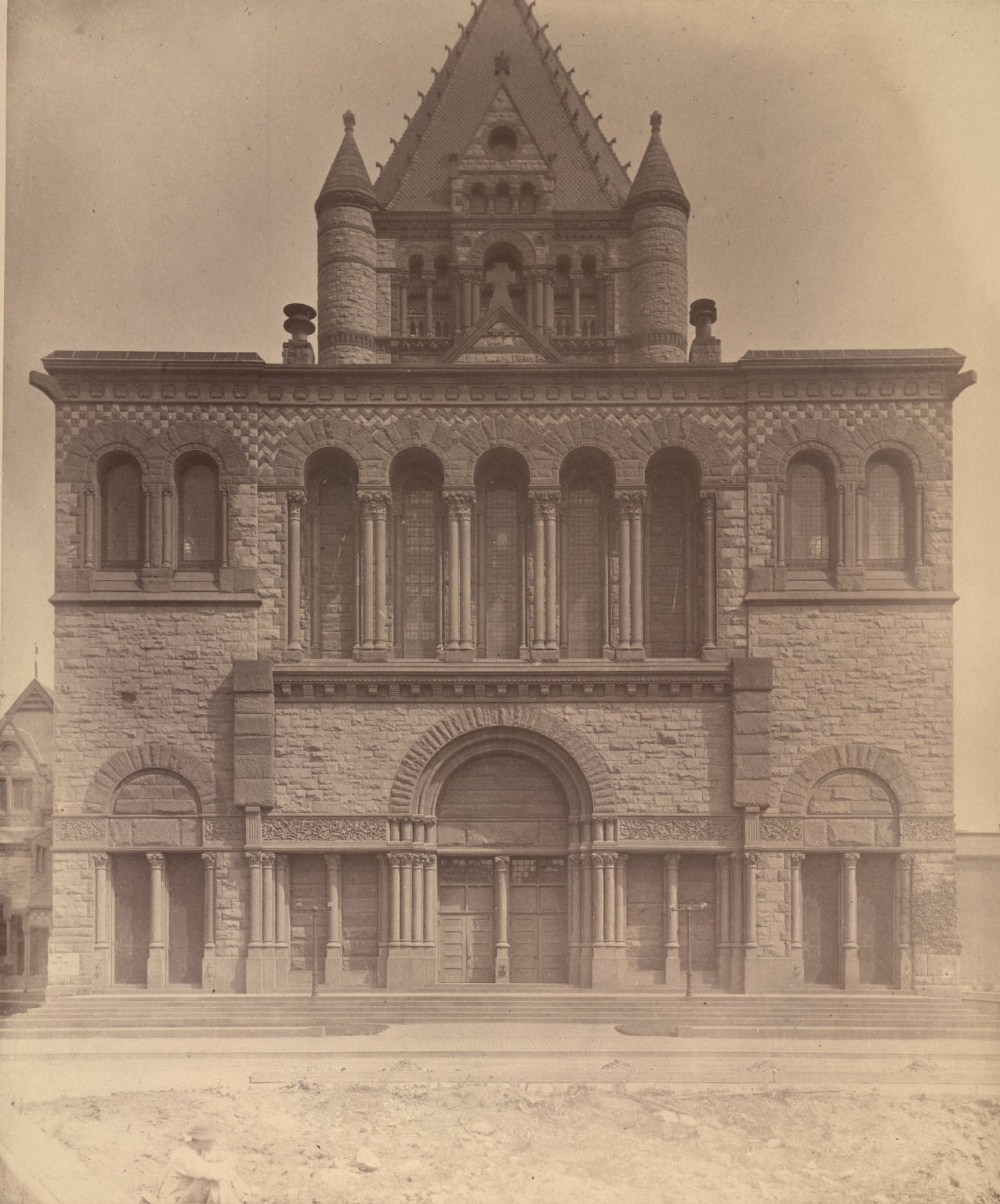
Trinity Church, Boston

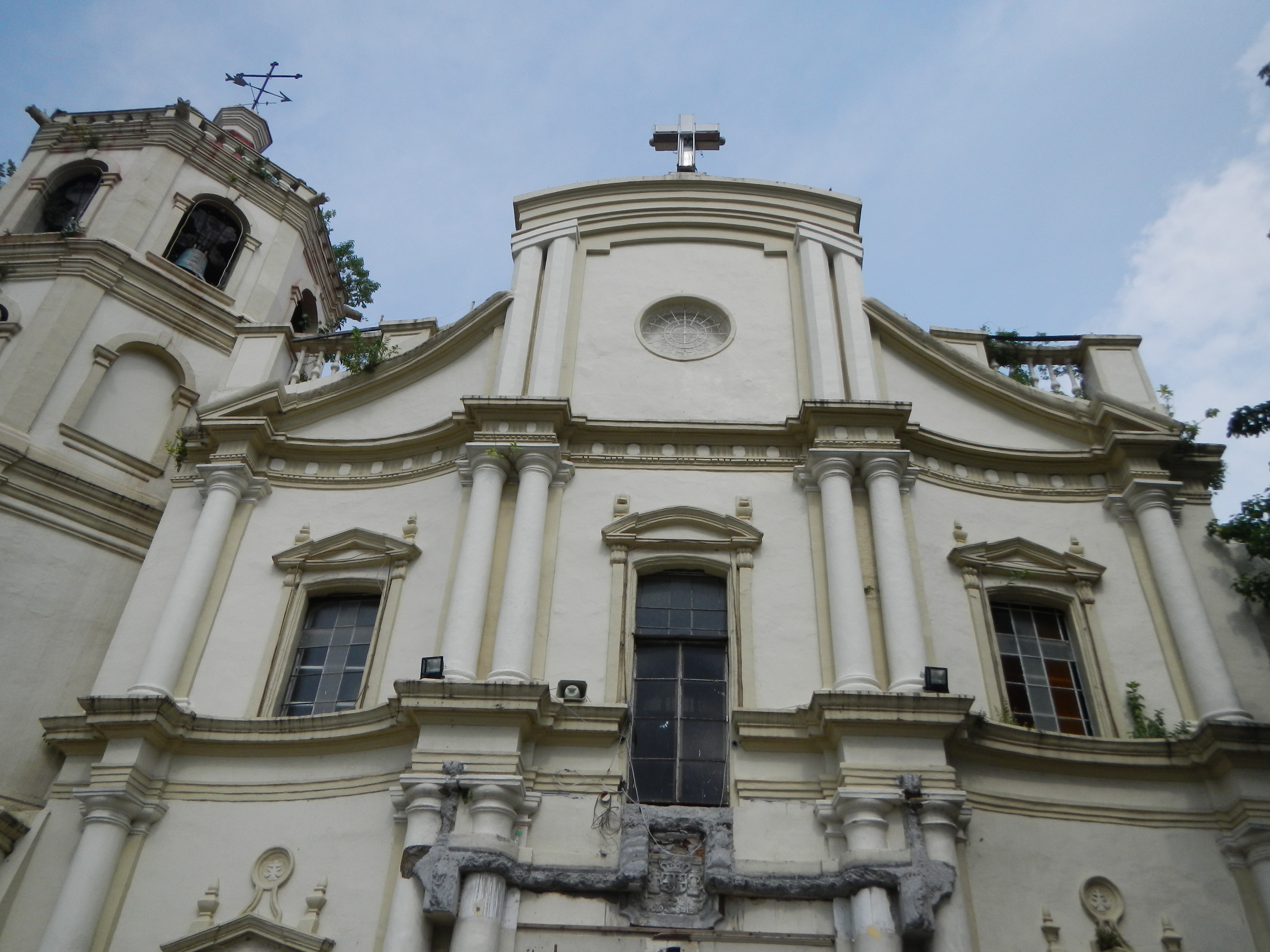
St. Paul the First Hermit Cathedral — N. Paulino St, Barangay V-D, Poblacion, San Pablo City, Laguna Province, Philippines.

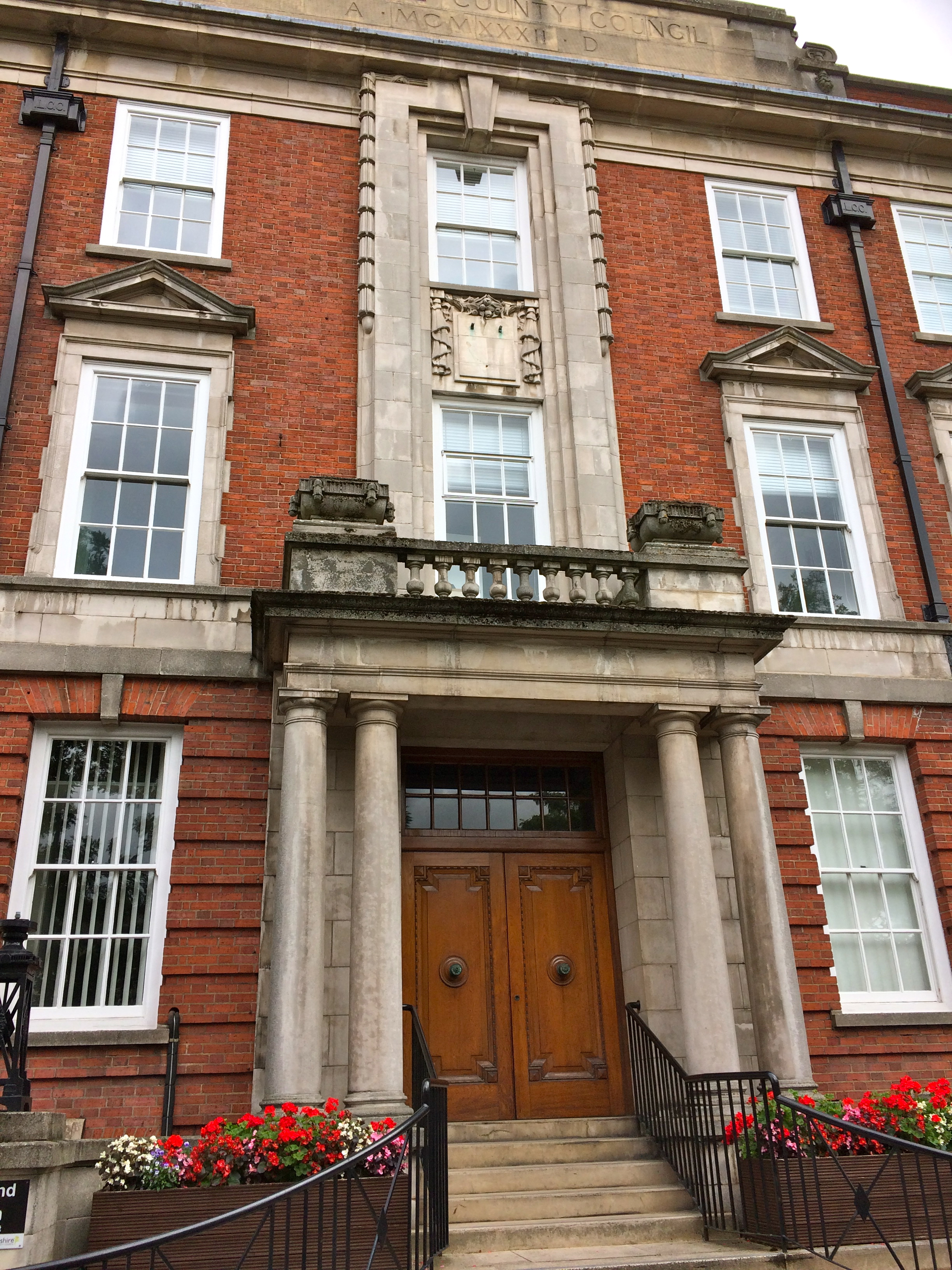
Lincolnshire County Offices, Entrance Portico

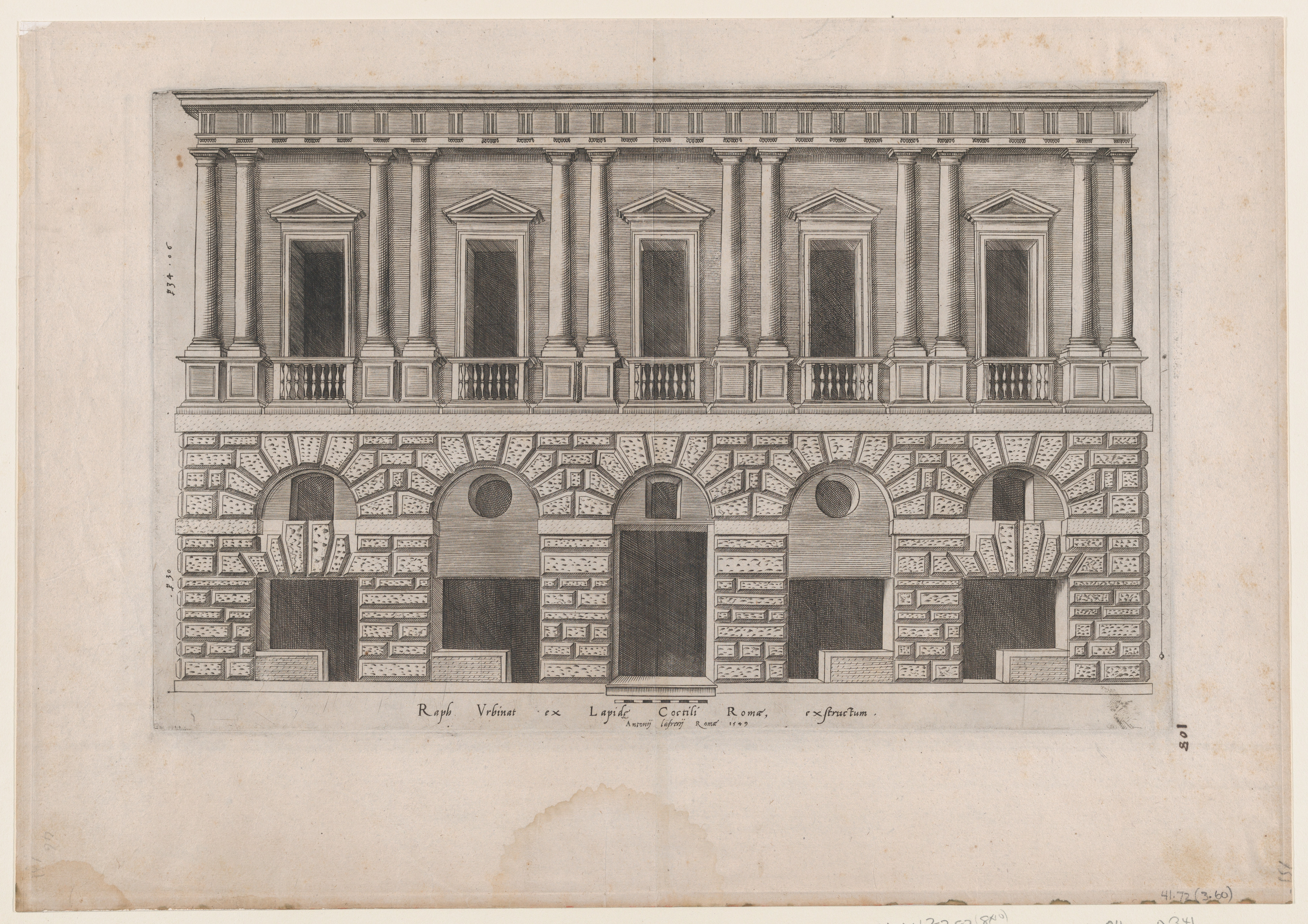
House of Raphael in Rome, 1512

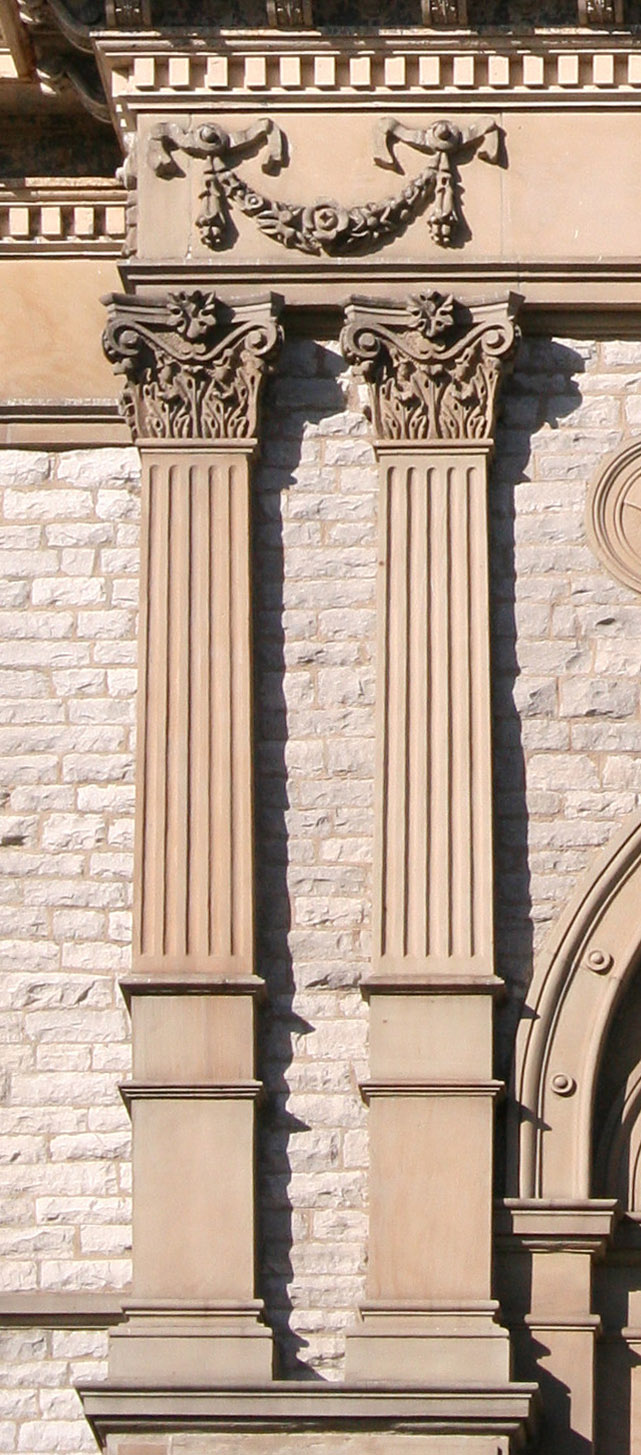
Paired Corinthian pilasters with high bases on the county courthouse in Sidney, Ohio
