= Palazzo Rusticucci-Accoramboni =

Building in Rome, Italy

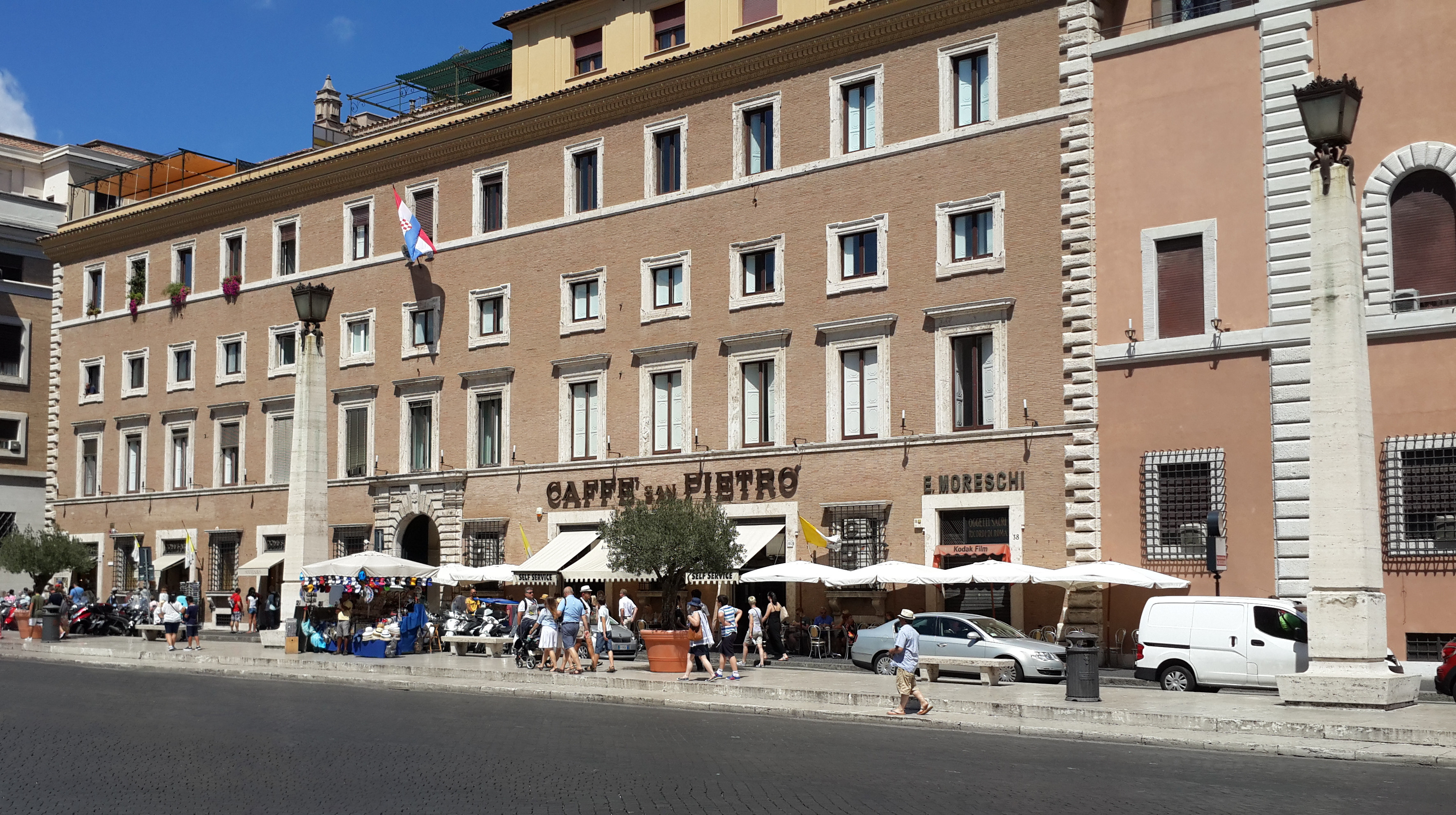
- The building's main facade along Via della Conciliazione
- Interactive map of the Palazzo Rusticucci-Accoramboni area

General information
- Location: Rome, Italy
- Coordinates: 41°54′9.70″N 12°27′36.00″E

The Palazzo Rusticucci-Accoramboni (also known as Palazzo Rusticucci or Palazzo Accoramboni) is a reconstructed late Renaissance palace in Rome. Erected by the will of Cardinal Girolamo Rusticucci, it was designed by Domenico Fontana and Carlo Maderno joining together several buildings already existing. Due to that, the building was not considered a good example of architecture. Originally lying along the north side of the Borgo Nuovo street, after 1667 the building faced the north side of the large new square located west of the new Saint Peter's Square, designed in those years by Gian Lorenzo Bernini. The square, named Piazza Rusticucci after the palace, was demolished in 1937–40 because of the erection of the new Via della Conciliazione. In 1940 the palace was dismantled and rebuilt with a different footprint along the north side of the new avenue, constructed between 1936 and 1950, which links St Peter's Basilica and the Vatican City to the center of Rome.

== Location ==
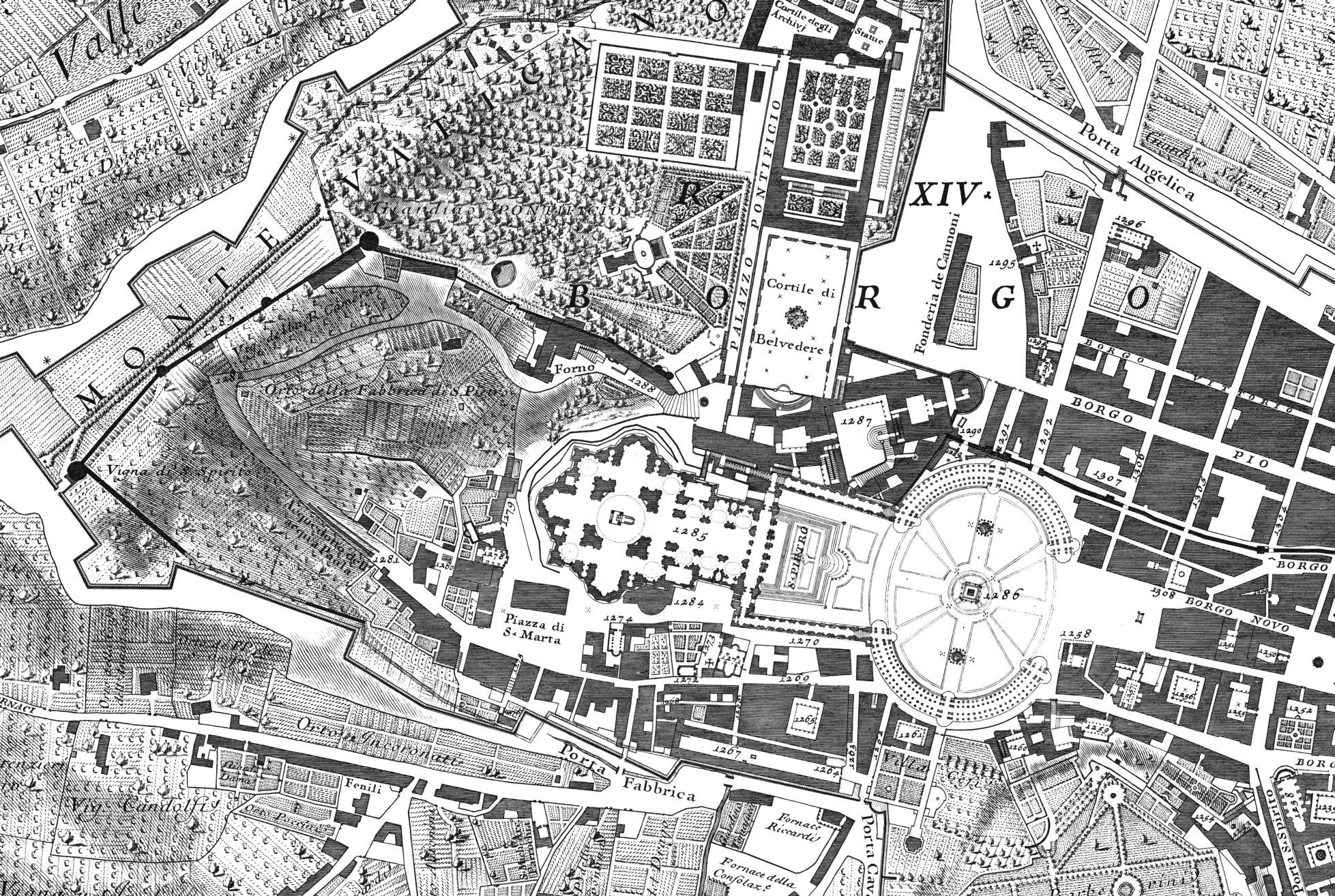
Original position of palazzo Rusticucci (n. 1308), the second building east of the northern Colonnade of St. Peter, from Nuova Topografia di Roma by Giambattista Nolli (1748)

The palace is located in the Borgo rione of Rome along the north side of Via della Conciliazione avenue, its main facade facing south. It belongs to the same block as the Palazzo dei Convertendi, another Renaissance building demolished in the late 1930s and reconstructed in the 1940s east of it. To the west Via Rusticucci separates it from the north Propylaea delimiting the square Piazza Pio XII (which roughly occupies the same area as the old Piazza Rusticucci) and facing Saint Peter's Square. The north side of the building borders two other reconstructed Renaissance edifices of Borgo: the Palazzo Jacopo da Brescia and the house of the physician of Paul III.

== History ==
=== Renaissance and baroque ===
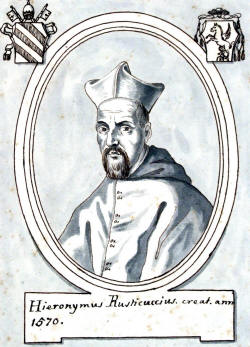
Cardinal Girolamo Rusticucci, first owner of the palace

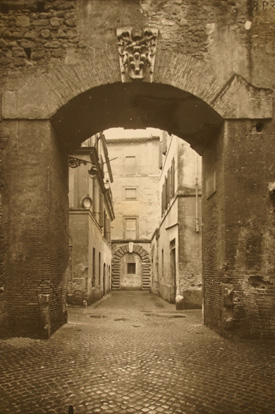
The rear side of Palazzo Rusticucci (the building in the background with rusticated portal) seen from Vicolo del Farinone, with the Passetto di Borgo in the foreground, before the demolition of the neighborhood (ca. 1930). The coat of arms above the arch belongs to Pope Pius V Medici (r. 1566–72)

Girolamo Rusticucci, secretary of Pope Pius V (r. 1566–72), who in 1570 appointed him Cardinal of Santa Susanna, bought a palace lying almost at the end of the Via Alessandrina (the road later named Borgo Nuovo) in Borgo on 31 March 1572. This building, once owned by Roberto Strozzi (exponent of the banker family from Florence), had been sold in 1567 to Pope Pius V, who donated it immediately to his nephew Paolo Ghislieri. Ghislieri sold it to the Cardinal five years later with the accordance of the pope. In order to enlarge his building, Rusticucci also bought several nearby houses. Selling negotiation not always finished successfully: an old woman refused to sell her home, forcing the architect to engulf it in the enlarged palace. However, the woman and her heirs could live there until they sold it to the owner of the "Caffè San Pietro", one of the oldest coffee shops in the city. The strong-willed opposition of another owner forced the cardinal to renounce to extend the building to the east until Borgo Sant'Angelo, although the works had already commenced. A powerful angular rustication erected at the corner between Borgo Sant'Angelo and Borgo Nuovo testified until 1937 about the Rusticucci's intention. Several years went by after the acquisition of Ghislieri's palace, until in 1584 Rusticucci gave the task to design a larger palace to architect Domenico Fontana. After Fontana's transferral to Naples who, after the death of Sixtus V (r. 1585–90) and the brief intermezzo of Innocent IX (r. Oct.-Dec. 1591), could not win the favor of Pope Clement VIII (r. 1592–1605), the task was finished by his nephew Carlo Maderno. It is also worth noticing that in the early 16th century one of the houses which predated the palace hosted an osteria. In the late 1510s Raphael, at that time painting the Vatican loggias, often had lunch together with his aides in a rear room of that eatery. The artists often discussed work problems during lunch, sketching different solutions on the walls of the room. When the palace was built, the osteria remained in place, and the owners always took care of the walls of that room throughout the years.

Around 1630 the palace housed for a brief time the Collegio Nazareno, one of the oldest schools in Rome, founded in those years by Joseph Calasanz, and presently in Via del Bufalo, in Trevi rione.

After that, the Rusticucci's heirs sold the building to Mario Accoramboni, member of a family of lesser nobility which had emigrated from the umbrian town of Gubbio to Rome. Exponents of the family acquired a high rank in the church and in the city: Ottavio was bishop of Fossombrone and Urbino, Roberto vicelegato at Ferrara, and during the epidemic of 1657, the owner of the palace, Roberto Accoramboni, received the task (personally given by Pope Alexander VII) of defending Borgo from the plague. In 1667, the erection of the Colonnades of St. Peter's square by Gian Lorenzo Bernini made it necessary to demolish the last block of houses ("isola") in front of the new square, situated between the roads of Borgo Vecchio and Borgo Nuovo: this block was named "isola del Priorato", since one of its buildings hosted the Priory of the knights of Rhodes. The demolition created a large new square, which was delimited on the north side by Palazzo Rusticucci. This square, representing the vestibule of Saint Peter's Square, took its name from the building. In 1775 in a shop at the ground floor was founded the "Caffè San Pietro", one of the oldest Coffee Houses in Rome.

=== Modern age ===
On 4 March 1902 the palace became the seat of the Belgian Historical Institute, and after a short time was acquired by the Congregation of Propaganda Fide. In 1940, because of the construction of the Via della Conciliazione, it was demolished and partially rebuilt in the same year with design by Clemente Busiri Vici, exponent of a Roman dynasty of architects.

Through the expropriation decrees, the commercial activities in the palace are known: in 1937 two shops were active along Piazza Rusticucci selling religious articles: moreover, the ground floor of the building hosted a tobacconist, a bakery, a pastry shop and a restaurant.

The bakery was originally the aforementioned osteria where Raphael had painted his sketches. Towards the mid-19th century a Papal Zouave was killed in that eatery, which was shut down by the authorities as a result . When the shop was reopened several years after the capture of Rome on 20 September 1870, hosting first a pizzeria, then the aforementioned bakery, the rooms were renovated, and all the sketches were lost.

== Description ==
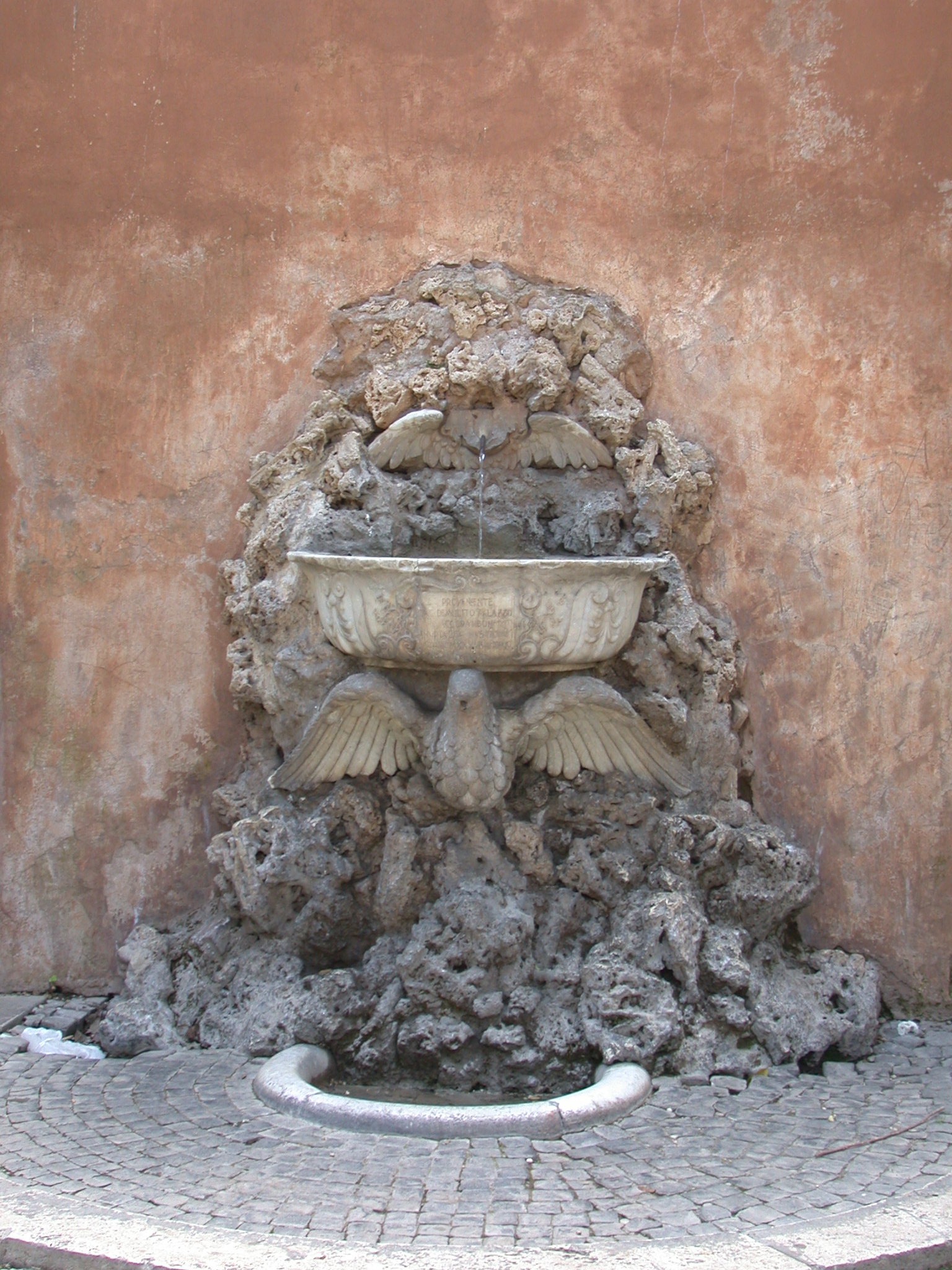
Fountain of Palazzo Rusticucci, now kept in the garden of Sant'Alessio

The original building had a harmonious and unadorned prospect, known through Rome's plan by Antonio Tempesta published in 1593, published when the palace was just finished, with seventeen windows and three floors. The facade along Via Alessandrina resembles those of coeval buildings, like Palazzo Ruspoli, built in Via del Corso by Bartolomeo Ammannati. Resulting from the union of several small houses, the edifice was very long, especially after the addition of another wing at the west end, along Via del Mascherino, sixty years after the death of Rusticucci in 1603. After this addition, the palace was unanimously described by the coeval city's guides as "lacking grace". Its main front had a monotonous and modest appearance: it was 83.35 metres (273.5 ft) long, with three floors and a mezzanine, twenty-two windows and a rusticated portal. Its area covered 2,700 square metres (29,000 sq ft). To the right of the entrance lay a rectangular yard with three orders, doric, ionic and corinthian. On the opposite side lay a smaller square yard, surrounded by a portico with serliana.

The reconstructed building is shorter, having only 13 windows along its façade, which shows exposed bricks. The two yards have been rebuilt, while the cornices of the windows and the portal come from the original edifice. The palace as of today (2016) still hosts the "Caffè San Pietro", which has its seat here since its establishment.

A fountain erected in the palace's yard has been moved to the garden lying between the church of S. Alessio and that of Santa Sabina on the Aventine Hill.

== Sources ==
- Borgatti, Mariano (1926). Borgo e S. Pietro nel 1300 – 1600 – 1925 (in Italian). Roma: Federico Pustet.
- Ceccarelli, Giuseppe (Ceccarius) (1938). La "Spina" dei Borghi (in Italian). Roma: Danesi.
- Castagnoli, Ferdinando; Cecchelli, Carlo; Giovannoni, Gustavo; Zocca, Mario (1958). Topografia e urbanistica di Roma (in Italian). Bologna: Cappelli.
- Cambedda, Anna (1990). La demolizione della Spina dei Borghi (in Italian). Roma: Fratelli Palombi Editori. ISSN 0394-9753.
- Gigli, Laura (1992). Guide rionali di Roma (in Italian). Vol. Borgo (III). Roma: Fratelli Palombi Editori. ISSN 0393-2710.
