= Palazzo Caprini =

Destroyed palazzo in Rome, designed by Donato Bramante for Raphael

Coordinates: 41.9026°N 12.4606°E

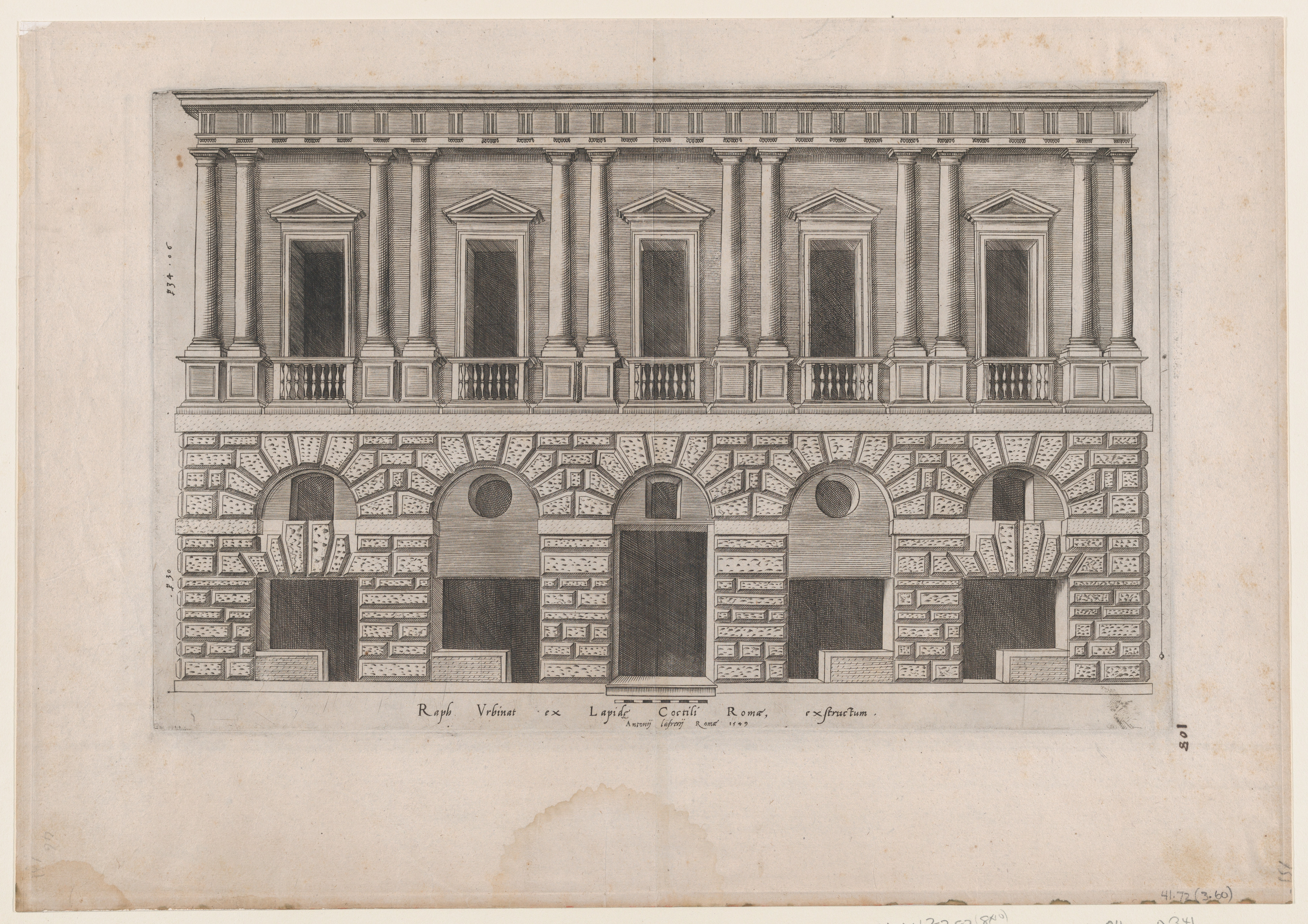
- 16th-century etching published by Antoine Lafréry
- Interactive map of the Palazzo Caprini area

General information
- Architectural style: Renaissance
- Location: Rome, Italy

Design and construction
- Architect: Donato Bramante

Palazzo Caprini was a Renaissance palazzo in Rome, Italy, in the Borgo rione between Piazza Scossacavalli and via Alessandrina (also named Borgo Nuovo). It was designed by Donato Bramante around 1510, or a few years before.

It was also known as the Palazzo di Raffaello or House of Raphael, since the artist Raphael had bought it in 1517 and lived there until his death three years later, although by then he was planning to build a much larger palazzo elsewhere. In the late 16th century, the Palazzo Caprini, already decayed and crumbling, underwent a total renovation and constituted the core of the much larger Palazzo dei Convertendi. The garden house of the Palazzo Caprini was not destroyed until 1848.

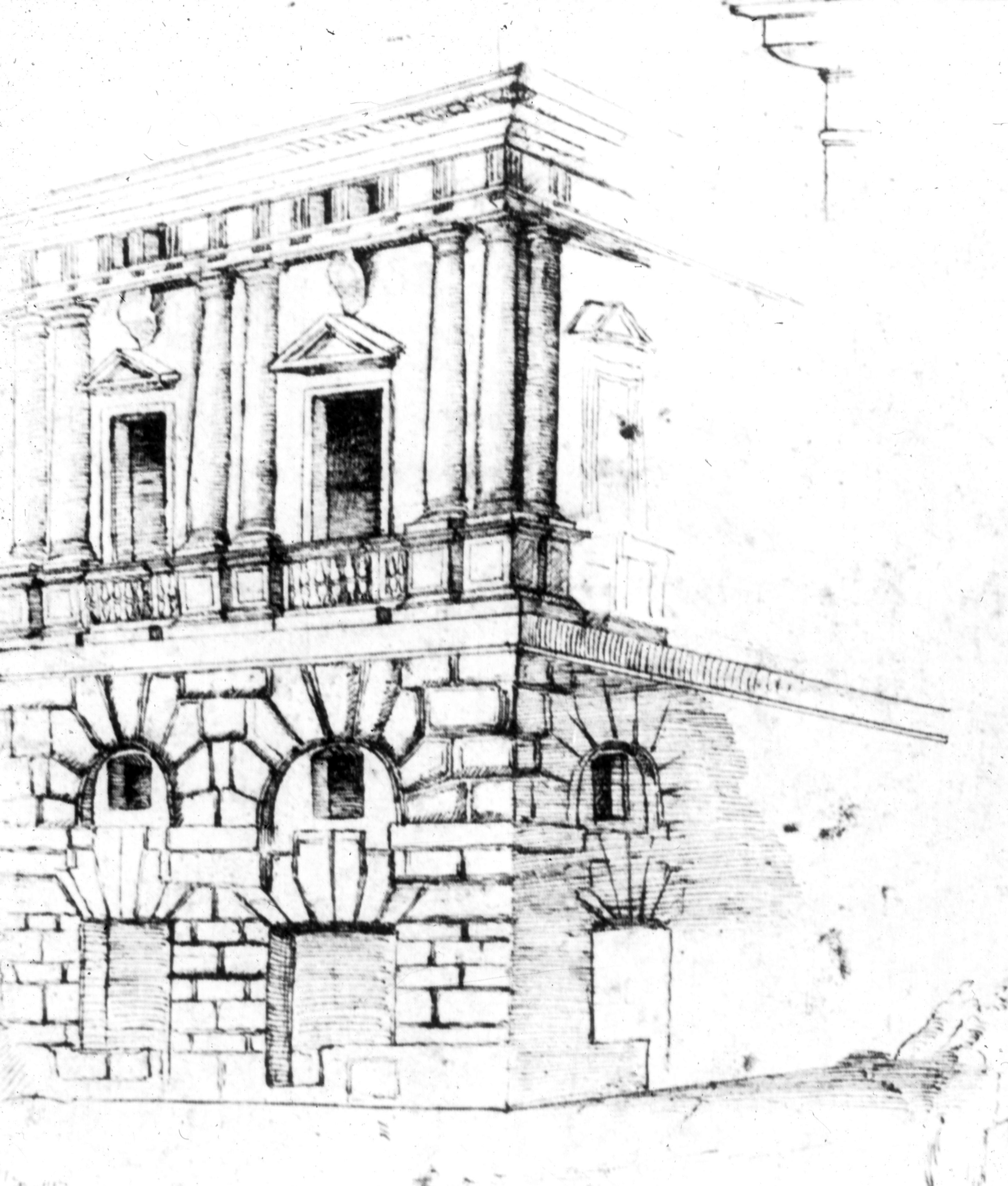
Palladio's sketch

The appearance of the Palazzo Caprini's main facade is known from an etching published by Antoine Lafréry and a partial sketch attributed to Andrea Palladio. It had five bays and two levels, with rustication (using stucco) on the lower floor which, as often in Rome, was let out to shops. The upper floor had windows divided by coupled columns of the Doric order, surmounted by a complete entablature. It was highly influential, providing a standard model for the integration of the rusticated ground floor with arched openings, characteristic of 15th-century Florentine palaces alla antica such as the Pitti Palace, with the classical orders. The decorative inclusion of large rusticated voussoirs and keystone instead of a lintel over the flat top of the lower rectangular openings in the end shop fronts was also a device with a long future. The apparent strength of a blind arched arcade with emphatic voussoirs on the rusticated ground storey gave reassuring support to the upper storey's paired Doric columns standing on rusticated piers, set against a smooth wall. The many buildings providing variations of the design include Somerset House in London and the Louvre Colonnade.

== Sources ==
- Bruschi, A. (1969). Bramante architetto.
- Bruschi, A. (1989). "Edifici privati di Bramante a Roma". Palladio. II (4).
- Gigli, Laura (1992). Guide rionali di Roma (in Italian). Vol. Borgo (III). Roma: Fratelli Palombi Editori. ISSN 0393-2710.
- Grimm, Herman. Leben Michelangelo's
- Summerson, John (1980). The Classical Language of Architecture. Thames and Hudson World of Art series, ISBN 0500201773.
