= Palazzo dei Convertendi =

Coordinates: 41°54′9.70″N 12°27′38.20″E

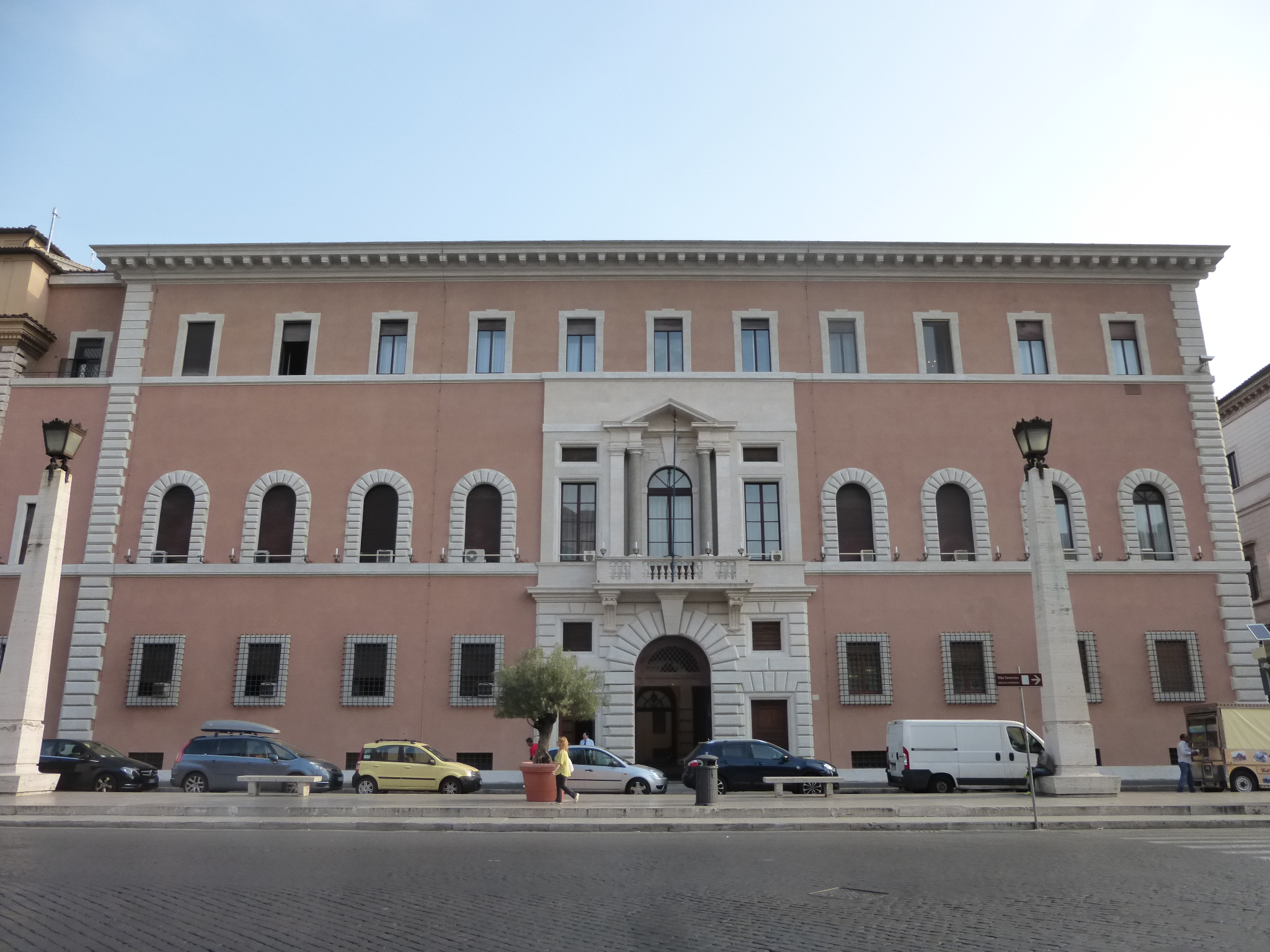
- The building's main facade along Via della Conciliazione

General information
- Architectural style: Renaissance
- Location: Rome, Italy

Palazzo dei Convertendi (also Palazzo della Congregazione per le Chiese orientali) is a reconstructed Renaissance palace in Rome. It originally faced the Piazza Scossacavalli, but was demolished and rebuilt along the north side of Via della Conciliazione, the wide avenue constructed between 1936 and 1950, which links St Peter's Basilica and the Vatican City to the centre of Rome. The palace is famous as the last home of the painter Raphael, who died there in 1520.

== Location ==
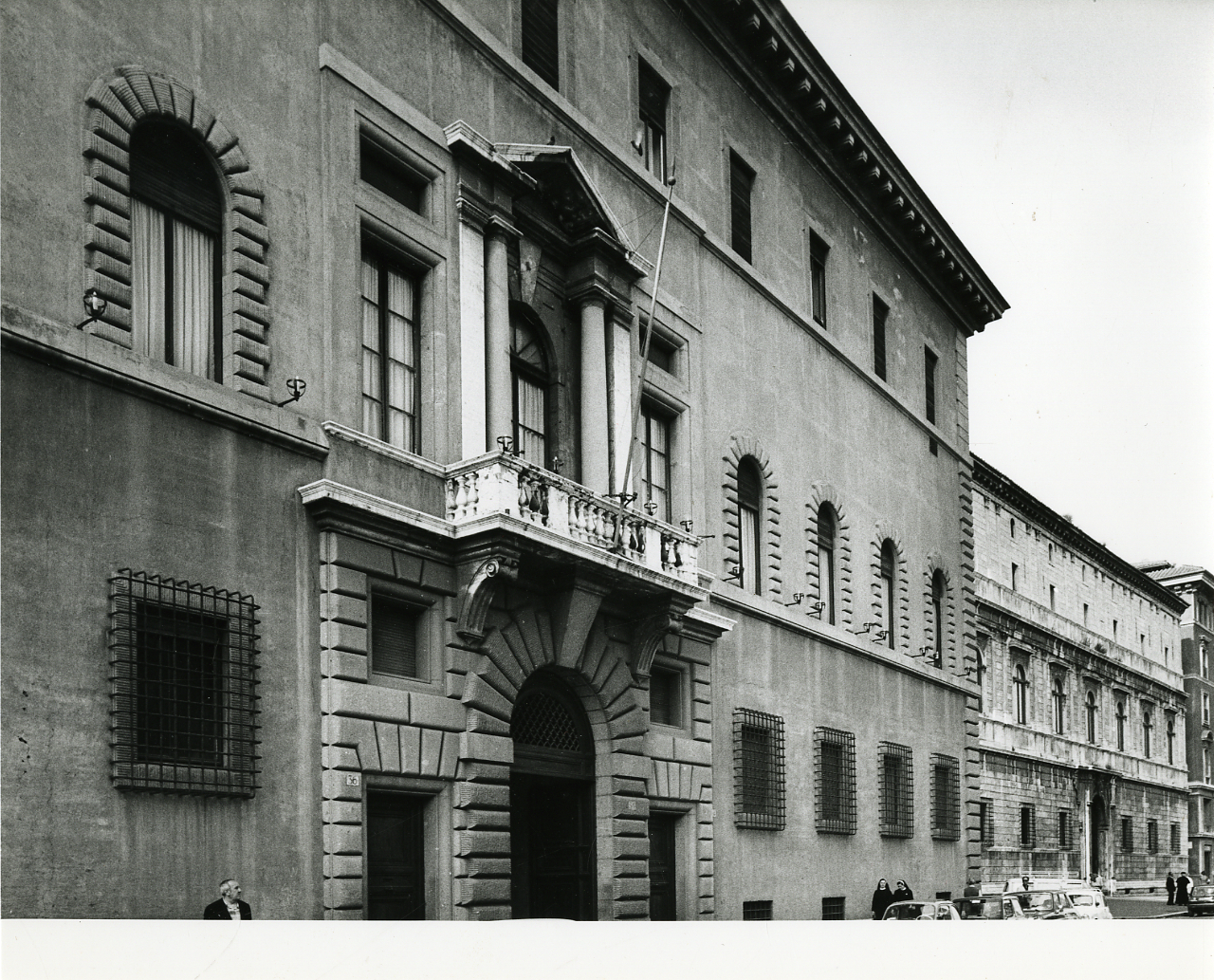
View of the palace; in the background Palazzo Castellesi. Photo by Paolo Monti, 1979

The palace is located in the rione Borgo of Rome along the north side of Via della Conciliazione. The palazzo's principal facade faces south. The east facade faces Via dell'Erba, which separates it from Palazzo Torlonia, another Renaissance building. To the west lies Palazzo Rusticucci-Accoramboni, another Renaissance building demolished and reconstructed in the 1940.

== History ==
=== Palazzo Caprini ===
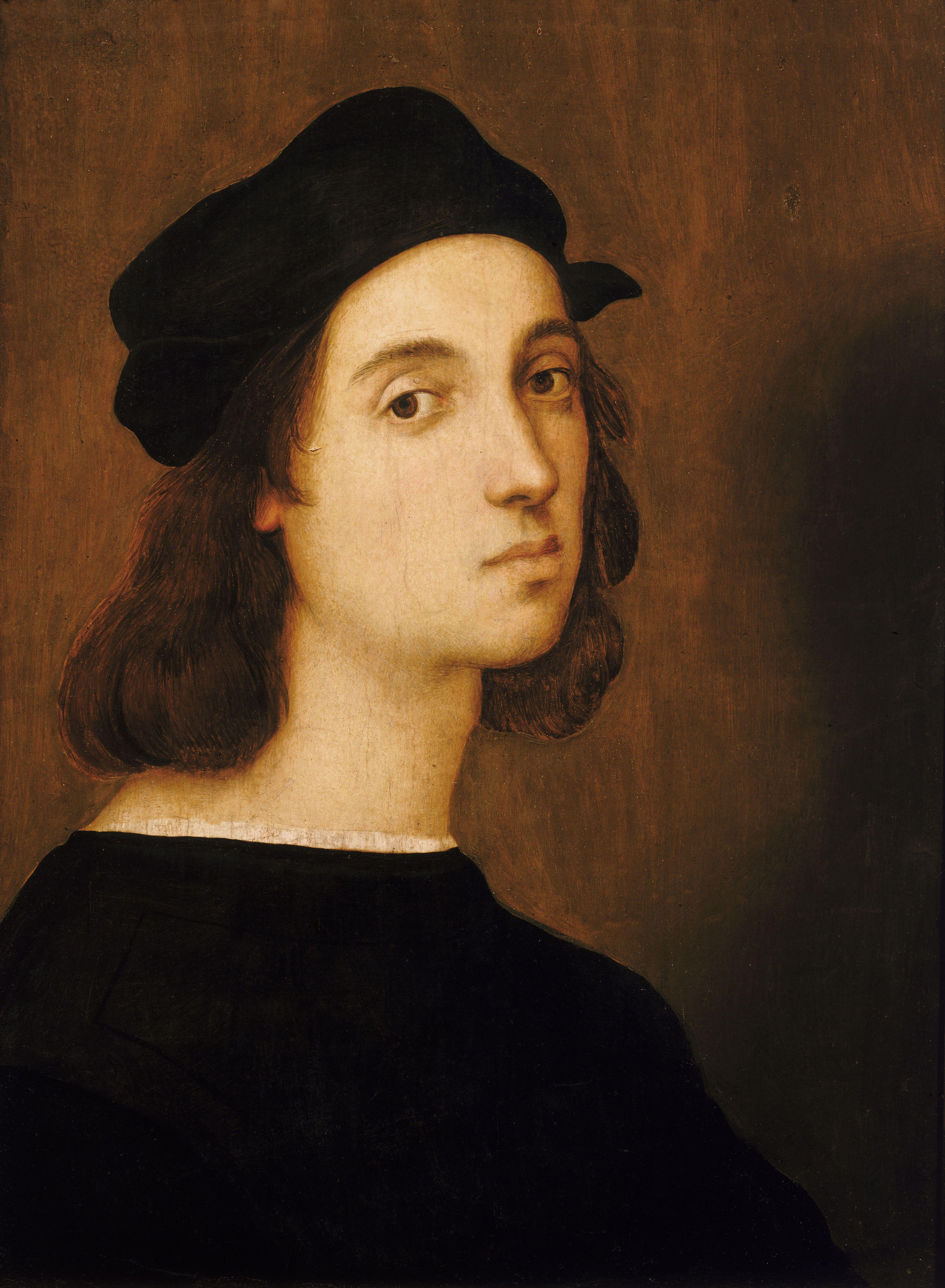
Raphael purchased Palazzo Caprini in 1517, spending the last three years of his life there

Towards the middle of the 15th century, a house named "della stufa" stood at the northwest edge of the little Piazza Scossacavalli in Borgo. A stufa (from the German word stube) was something between a Roman bath and a modern sauna, often attended by artists who could freely sketch nudes there. In 1500 the house was sold to the apostolic protonotary Adriano (or Alessandro) de Caprineis, of the noble Caprini family of Viterbo. During those years, Pope Alexander VI Borgia (r. 1492–1503 ) was pursuing a project to open a new road between Castel Sant'Angelo and the Old St. Peter's Basilica. This road was named Via Alessandrina after the pope and later Borgo Nuovo, and was officially inaugurated in 1500. People willing to erect buildings at least 5 canne (11 m (36 ft) ca.) high along the new road received special privileges, such as tax exemptions. The Caprini fulfilled this obligation by buying a portion of another house near the stufa and erecting there a small palazzo designed by Donato Bramante. It was unfinished on 7 October 1517, when the Caprini sold it for 3,000 ducati to Raphael. The artist completed the construction, spending there the last three years of his life. He painted in those rooms the Transfiguration, and died there on 6 April 1520.

After Raphael's death, the building was sold to the Cardinal of Ancona, Pietro Accolti, who already owned another palazzo on via Alessandrina, separated from the building through a house which the Cardinal bought later. After the death of the Cardinal, the palace was inherited by his nephew Benedetto, Cardinal of Ravenna. Accused of corruption, the Cardinal was imprisoned in Castel Sant'Angelo in 1534 and released after paying a fine of 59,000 scudi to the Apostolic Chamber. The cardinal had to borrow the huge sum from the Florentine bankers Giulio and Lorenzo Strozzi, who later acquired his palace for 6,000 scudi as partial reimbursement of the loan. However, the Cardinal reserved the right to redeem the building after repaying his creditors, and this led to a lawsuit between his heirs and the heirs of the Strozzi. The latter won, but in 1576 they were forced to sell the building, which was crumbling and whose walls had been shored up, to Cardinal Giovanni Francesco Commendone.

=== Palazzo dei Convertendi ===
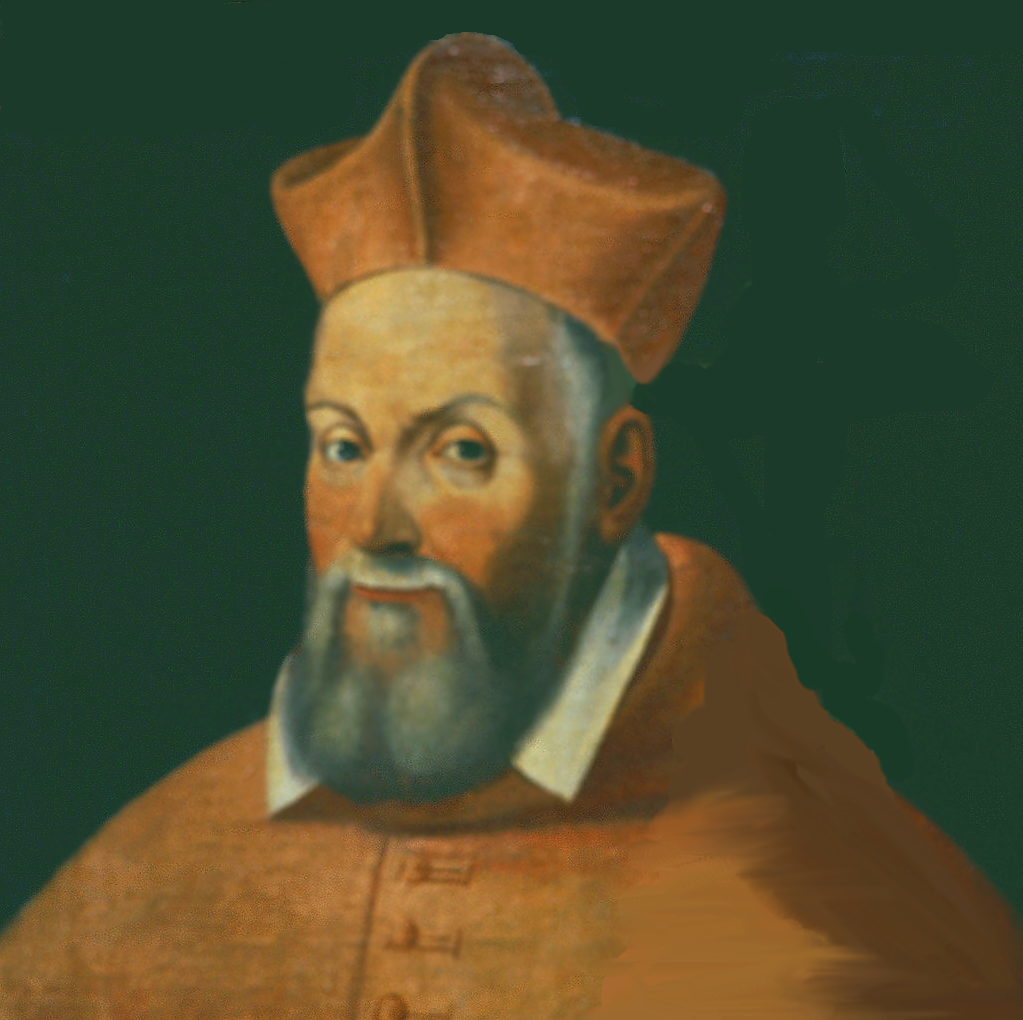
Cardinal Giovanni Francesco Commendone ordered the transformation of the building into its definitive form

Commendone had the palace restored by Annibale Lippi, who had assessed it before the purchase. Lippi possibly gave the facade its definitive shape. The palace was then sold after 1584 to Camilla Peretti, the sister of Pope Sixtus V (r. 1585–90), who bought it on behalf of her brother for her grandnephew, Cardinal Alessandro Peretti di Montalto. Camilla Peretti bought also some houses facing Piazza Scossacavalli and Borgo Vecchio, so that the palace reached its full extension. According to others, after the death of Commendone, the palace was sold to Cardinal Giovanni Antonio Facchinetti, the future Pope Innocentius IX (r. 1591), whose heirs then sold it in 1614 to the Apostolic Chamber. Around 1620, the palace was purchased by members of the House of Spinola, a noble Genoese family, who sold it in 1676 to another Genoese patrician, Cardinal Girolamo Gastaldi (1616–85).

Gastaldi, who died in his palace on 8 April 1685, willed the edifice to the Hospice of the Convertendi, which moved there in 1715. This institution, founded in 1600 by Pope Clement VIII (r. 1592–1605), was devoted to the protection of the Protestants who wanted to convert to the Catholic faith. The palace was directly under the authority of the Pope, and was administered by elected members of the institute superintended by the Maggiordomo pro tempore of the Apostolic Palace. The edifice was badly damaged during the flood of 1805, including the collapse of a vault in the basement, and restored by Pope Gregory XVI (r. 1831–46). Under the reign of Pope Pius IX (r. 1846–78) it housed the Collegio Ecclesiastico from 1852 to 1854. This was a seminary especially for English convert clergy that eventually became the Beda College. The palace underwent further restoration in 1876, and Pope Benedict XV (r. 1914–22) had the monumental staircase built.

=== Palazzo della Congregazione per le Chiese orientali ===
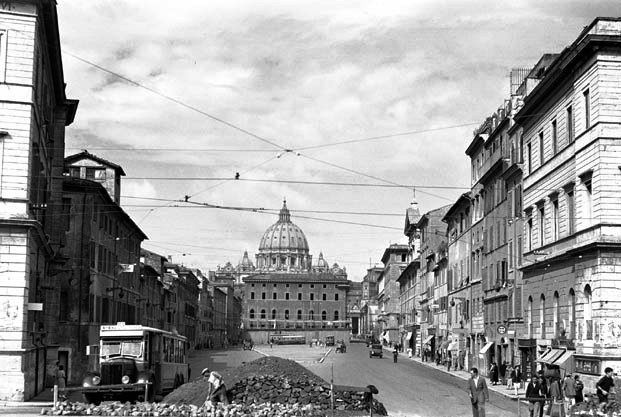
The palace (centre), photographed during its demolition in 1937, is dominated by the massive dome of St. Peter's behind it

Pope Benedict in 1917 assigned the building to the newly founded Congregation for the Oriental Churches. In 1929, within the framework of the Lateran Treaties, the palace enjoyed the privileges of extraterritoriality.

In 1937, during the construction of the Via della Conciliazione, the palace was demolished, and then reconstructed until 1941 west of Palazzo Torlonia. The relocation was supervised by Giuseppe Momo, the "court architect" of Pius XI (r. 1922–39), who after 1929 reshaped the new Vatican City. Momo collaborated in the reconstruction with Marcello Piacentini and Attilio Spaccarelli (the designers of via della Conciliazione). The architects moved the palace to an area that, until the mid-19th century, had been occupied by the houses of Soderini, an early Renaissance complex. The accuracy of the reconstruction allows the consideration of the rebuilt Palazzo dei Convertendi not as a new building, but as another phase in the centuries-old life of the edifice.

From 1939, when the reconstruction was still incomplete, the palace was home to the Magistero di Maria SS. Assunta school. In 1946, the school moved to new premises, also along Via della Conciliazione. Since that date, the palace has housed several offices of the Holy See and the apartments of high-ranking prelates.

== Description ==
=== Palazzo Caprini ===
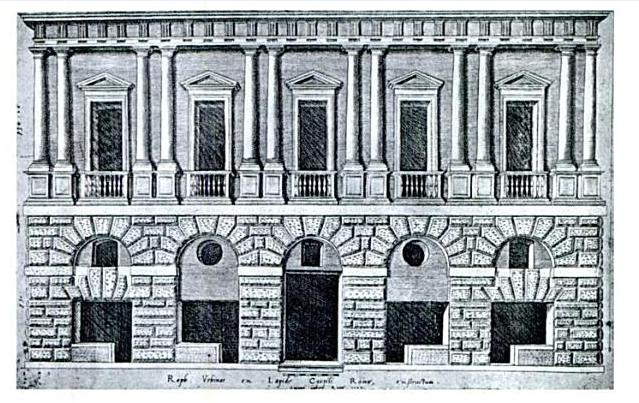
Palazzo Caprini's facade along Borgo Nuovo in a 1549 etching by Antoine Lafréry from Speculum Romanae Magnificentiae

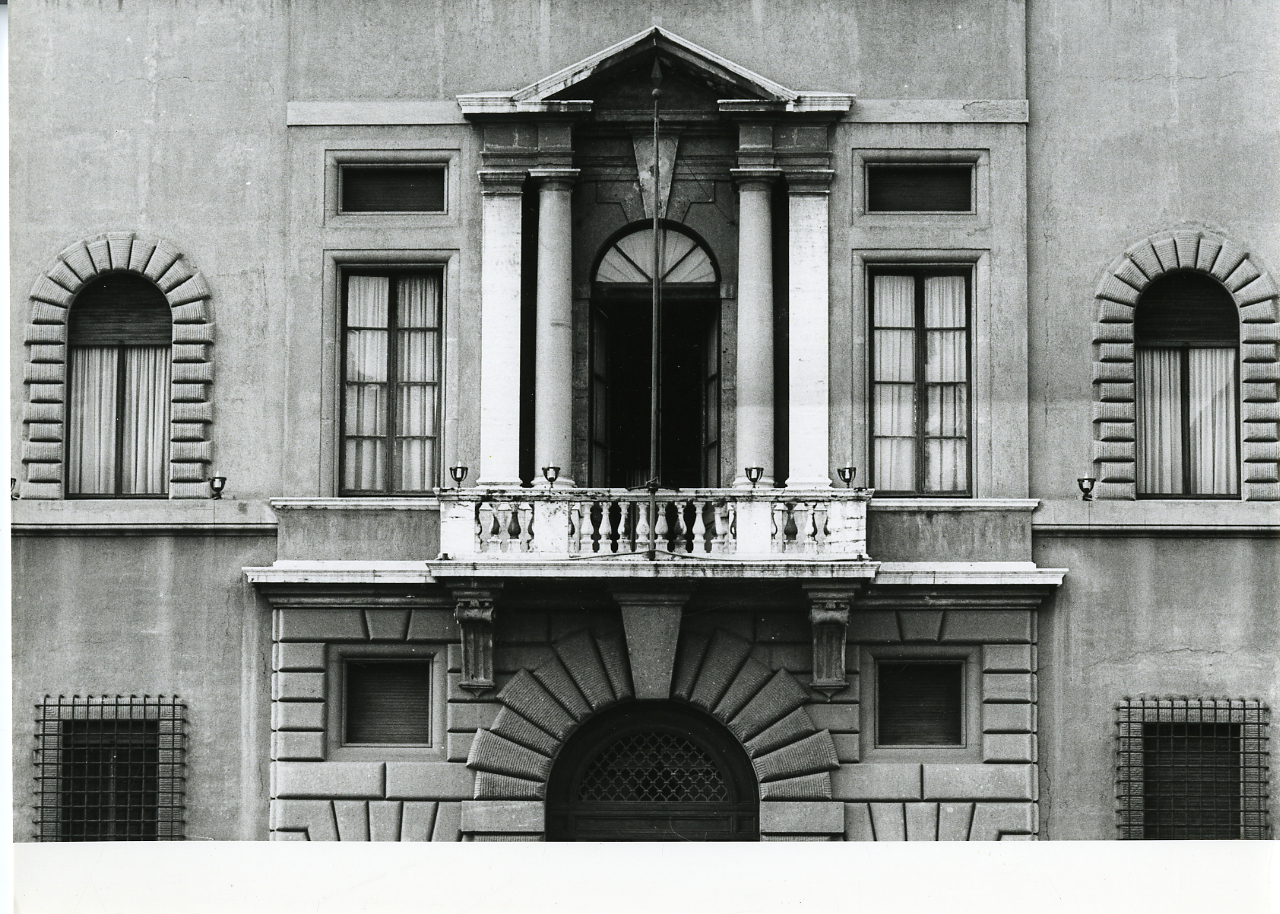
Detail of the facade. Photo by Paolo Monti, 1979

The original building is known only through etchings and drawings by contemporaries. These include an etching by Antoine Lafréry in 1549; drawings by Jean de Cheveniéres and Andrea Palladio (1541 ca.), Domenico Alfani (Christmas 1581), and Ottavio Mascherino; and a fresco in the Logge of Gregory XIII in the Vatican by Antonio Tempesta and Matthijs Bril, representing the translation in St. Peter of the corpse of Saint Gregory of Nazianzus. In addition, a detailed survey of the palace executed just before its demolition in 1937 was discovered, yielding precious information about its different construction phases. According to the drawing of Lafréry, the originary edifice had three windows on Piazza Scossacavalli and five on Borgo Nuovo. According to the survey of the 1930s, the main front faced Borgo Nuovo, with three windows along Piazza Scossacavalli and two along the former road. In this case, the drawing of Lafréry could be considered an idealisation of the building, which would be not an isolated case in his works.

The building had two main floors. The lower one was rusticated, with ashlar obtained through a process called "di getto", which involved mixing pozzolana, lime, and other materials in a formwork. The portal and the doors of the shops, surmounted arches which contained the small windows of a mezzanine, were placed in the rustication. The lower floor constituted the podium of the upper floor, which adopted the Doric order. This was marked by columns surmounted by an entablature, with architrave and frieze decorated with triglyphs and metopes. Parapets were inserted in the spans of the upper floor. The building was concluded by a service attic whose windows opened in the Doric frieze of the entablature.

This rustication technique was quickly adopted in Rome, and the building, which had been inspired by Roman architecture, was soon imitated (for example, at Palazzo Massimo alle Colonne, erected in 1532 by Baldassare Peruzzi). However, the palace was soon subject to decay. In a 1581 drawing, the rustication coating at the ground floor had disappeared, and after 1585, the two facades assumed a pronounced manierist look.

=== Palazzo dei Convertendi ===
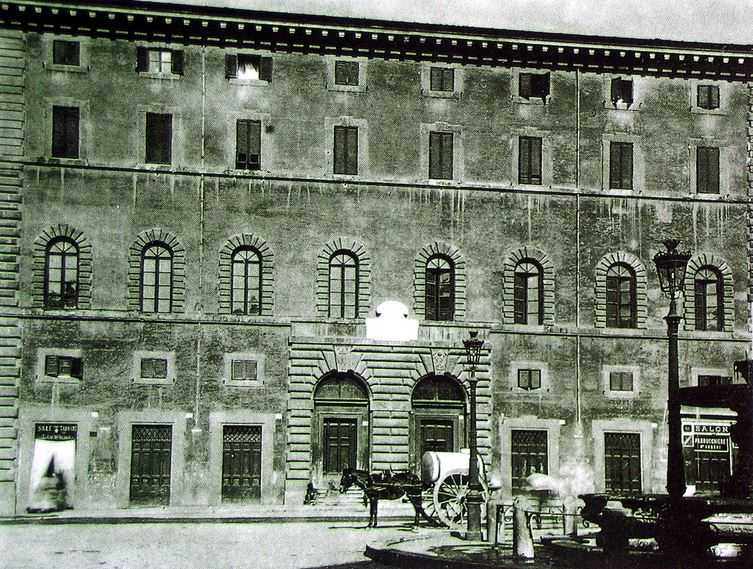
Facade of Palazzo dei Convertendi along Piazza Scossacavalli, 1920 ca.

Since that time, the palace occupied the whole west side of Piazza Scossacavalli, with six shops and two portals at its center. The left portal introduced into the small church of San Filippo Neri, erected in the 17th century by the Spinola and containing only one altar. The ground floor was surmounted by three floors, each with eight windows; those belonging to the piano nobile had centred and rusticated frames.

The facade on Borgo Nuovo had a ground floor with five shops, interrupted by a rusticated portal surmounted by a palladian window. Above it was a balcony, attributed to Carlo Fontana or Baldassarre Peruzzi, also rusticated and surmounted by a palladian window. This balcony was considered by the Romans as the most elegant in the city. The upper floors had fifteen rectangular windows. The manieristic style of the exterior originated from the centred windows framed by alternatively long and short ashlars, the white plastered walls contrasting with the rusticated portals, and the balcony along Borgo Nuovo, also rusticated.

At the end of the 19th century, spurs of a geometric white and black sgraffito decoration were discovered on the facade, and a living room with a coffer ceiling at the northeast edge of the first floor was identified as the room in which Raphael painted his last works, including the Transfiguration. At that time, a marble inscription commemorating the artist's ownership of the palace and his death there was affixed to the facade.

=== Reconstructed palace ===
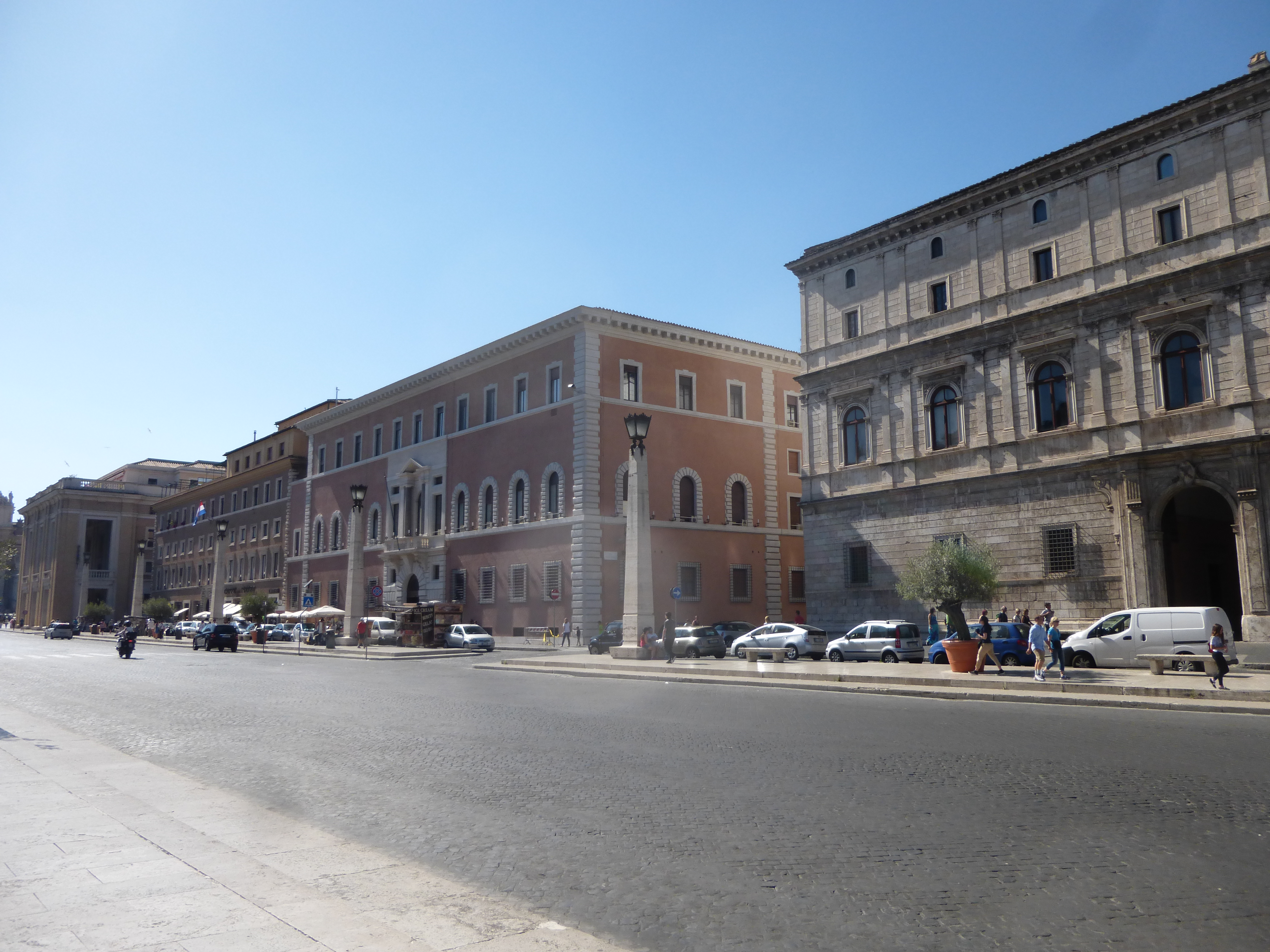
The reconstructed Palazzo between Palazzo Torlonia to the right and Palazzo Rusticucci-Accoramboni–also rebuilt–to the left

The building that exists today along Via della Conciliazione has two floors with a rusticated portal surmounted by Peruzzi's balcony. The building receives light from square windows at the ground floor, centred and rusticated windows on the piano nobile, and rectangular windows at the second floor. The roof is topped by a projecting cornice. The elements of the windows, of the portal, and of the balcony were dismounted from the original edifice and reused here.

In the building's porch, the aforementioned inscription is embedded in the wall, as well as a coat of arms of Alexander VI and another Latin inscription which reads:

HEIC / RAPHAEL SANCTIVS / E MORTALI VITA DECESSIT / DIE VI MENSIS APR. / ANNO REP. SALVTIS MDXX
Here died Raphael Sanzio on 6 April 1520

The building has a yard with arches resting on rusticated Doric pillars sustaining spherical vaults. On the first floor is a display of 120 Russian paintings on religious subjects, almost all produced by Russian painter Leonida Brailowsky (1872–1937). The new palace also contains several frescoes from the original building in Piazza Scossacavalli, among them a group of lunettes attributed to the school of Pomarancio, five landscape paintings in the so-called Popes (or Patriarchs) reception room on the first floor, and two battle scenes in the Audience room.

== See also ==
- Properties of the Holy See

== Sources ==
- Borgatti, Mariano (1926). Borgo e S. Pietro nel 1300 –1600 –1925 (in Italian). Roma: Federico Pustet.
- Ceccarelli, Giuseppe (Ceccarius) (1938). La "Spina" dei Borghi (in Italian). Roma: Danesi.
- Castagnoli, Ferdinando; Cecchelli, Carlo; Giovannoni, Gustavo; Zocca, Mario (1958). Topografia e urbanistica di Roma (in Italian). Bologna: Cappelli.
- Gigli, Laura (1990). Guide rionali di Roma (in Italian). Vol. Borgo (I). Roma: Fratelli Palombi Editori. ISSN 0393-2710.
- Gigli, Laura (1992). Guide rionali di Roma (in Italian). Vol. Borgo (III). Roma: Fratelli Palombi Editori. ISSN 0393-2710.
- Cambedda, Anna (1990). "La demolizione della Spina dei Borghi". Itinerari Didattici d'Arte e di Cultura (in Italian). Roma: Fratelli Palombi Editori. ISSN 0394-9753.
- Dal Mas, Roberta; Spagnesi, Gianfranco (2010). "Dalla Casa di Raffaello al Palazzo dei Convertendi". Quaderni dell'Istituto di Storia dell'Architettura (in Italian) (53). Roma: Bonsignori: 1–10. ISBN 978-88-7597-411-4.
