= Palazzo Jacopo da Brescia =

Coordinates: 41.9029°N 12.45967°E

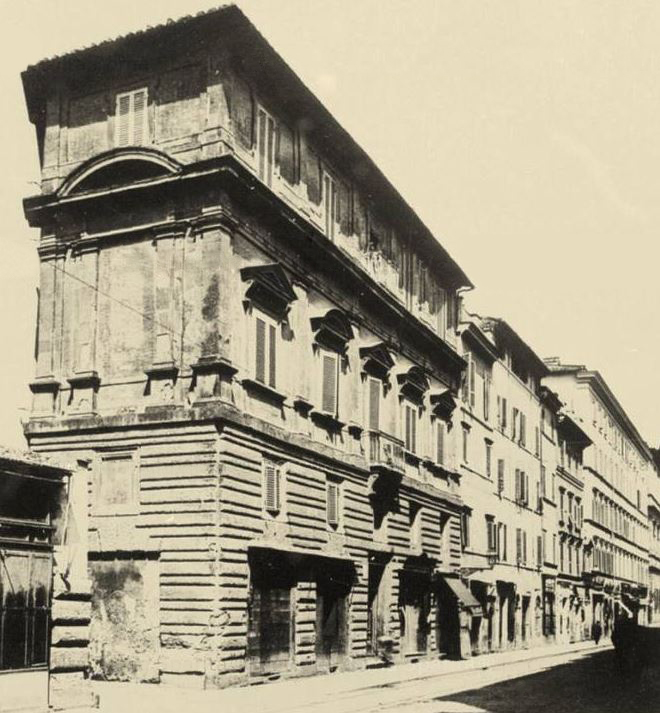
- The Palazzo Jacopo da Brescia along the Borgo Nuovo, c. 1930
- Interactive map of Palazzo Jacopo da Brescia

General information
- Location: Rome, Italy

Palazzo Jacopo da Brescia was a Renaissance palace in Rome, Italy, which was located in the Borgo rione.

It was built for Jacopo (also known as Giacomo di Bartolomeo) da Brescia, a physician at the service of Pope Leo X, between 1515 and 1519. Its design is commonly attributed to Raphael, and was based to Bramante's nearby Palazzo Caprini (also demolished). The palace, which had a triangular footprint, stood at the confluence of the Borgo Nuovo and the Borgo Sant'Angelo. On the Borgo Nuovo, the house bordered to the east the house of Febo Brigotti, doctor to Pope Paul III, another notable Renaissance building. It was demolished to allow the construction of Via della Conciliazione in 1937, and rebuilt (with a different footprint) along Via Rusticucci and Via dei Corridori, not far from its original location.
