= Canna (unit) =

Ancient Italian unit of length

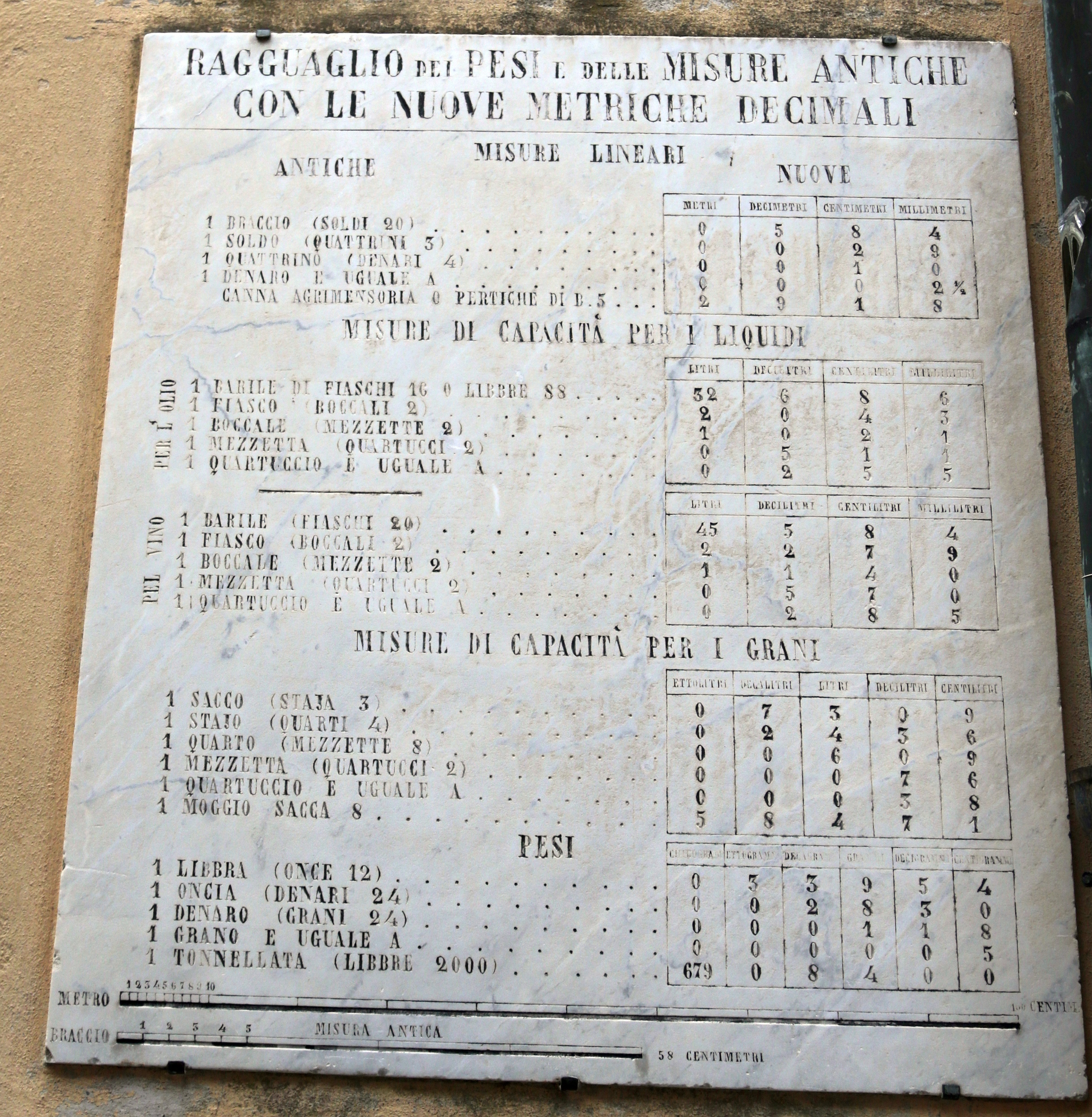
Metric conversion table, 1860

Canna (pl. canne; proper meaning in Italian: Cane) was an ancient Italian unit of length, which differed from place to place.

- Capua: 2.1768707 m (9th – 15th centuries)
- Republic of Genoa: 2.49095 m
- Kingdom of Naples:
  - canna: 2.1163952 m (edict of 6 April 1480)
  - canna: 2.6455026 m (law of 6 April 1840)
  - field surveying canna: 6.998684 m² (law of 6 April 1840)
- Romagna: 1.9928 m
- Sicily: 2.062 m
- Tuscany
  - field surveying canna, a.k.a. 5 "braccia" long "pertica": 2.9183 m
  - canna (fabric): 0.58366 m
- Rome
  - canna (architecture): 2.234 m
  - commercial canna: 1.992 m
- Teramo: 3.17 m
- Malta: 2.08 m (2 yd, 10 in)

== Sources ==
- Guidi, Giuseppe (1855) [1839]. Ragguaglio delle monete dei pesi e delle misure attualmente in uso negli stati italiani (in Italian). Firenze: Federico Pustet / Le Monnier.
