= Grif Italia =

Italian hang glider manufacturer

Coordinates: 42.2493532°N 12.3563154°E

Grif
- Company type: Private company
- Founded: 1989
- Founder: Italo Graziani
- Website: www.grifitalia.com

Grif Italia, or just Grif, is an Italian aircraft manufacturer based in Castel Sant'Elia. The company specializes in hang gliders and wings for ultralight trikes.

The company was founded in 1989 by hang glider pilot and instructor Italo Graziani. The company's motto is "Passion Into Innovation".

== Aircraft ==
Summary of aircraft built by
Model name	First flight	Number built	Type
Grif Eos	1997		competition hang glider
Grif Hobby	1995		beginner hang glider
Grif H2000	1995		beginner hang glider

== See also ==
- List of Italian companies
