= Lungotevere in Sassia =

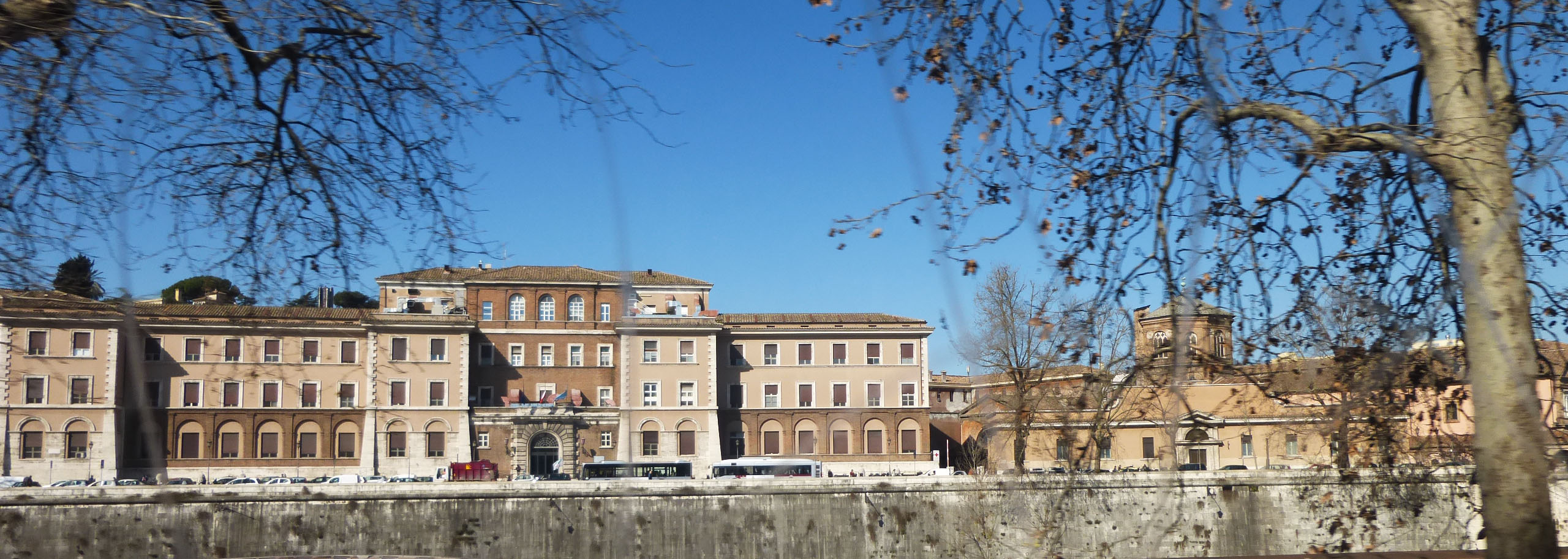
- Lungotevere in Sassia with the Ospedale di Santo Spirito in Sassia
- Interactive map of Lungotevere in Sassia
- Namesake: Schola Saxonum
- Type: Lungotevere
- Location: Borgo, Rome, Italy
- From: Piazza della Rovere
- To: Via San Pio X

Construction
- Inauguration: July 20, 1887

Other
- Known for: Ospedale di Santo Spirito in Sassia

Lungotevere in Sassia is the stretch of Lungotevere that links Piazza della Rovere to Via San Pio X in Rome (Italy), in the Rione Borgo.

The Lungotevere takes its name from the Schola Saxonum, a numerous Saxon community that settled in the Leonine City at King Ine's suite; it has been established as per deliberation of the city council dated 20 July 1887.

Along the Lungotevere rises the monumental complex of the Ospedale di Santo Spirito in Sassia, an ancient hospital along with its church, next to a modern medical centre.

== Bibliography ==
- Rendina, Claudio; Paradisi, Donatella (2004). Le strade di Roma. Third volume P-Z. Rome: Newton Compton Editori. ISBN 88-541-0210-5.
