= Rubiales =

Rubiales may refer to:

== Places ==
- Rubiales, Aragon, Spain
- Rubiales oil field, Llanos Basin, Meta Department, Colombia

== People ==
- Amparo Rubiales (born 1945), Spanish politician
- Luis Rubiales (born 1977), Spanish soccer player and former president of the Spanish soccer federation
- Marcela Rubiales (born 1953), Mexican singer

== Other uses ==
- Rubiales (plant), an order of flowering plants

== See also ==
- Rubiales affair, an incident during the trophy presentation at the 2023 FIFA Women's World Cup involving Luis Rubiales
- Francesco Rubiale (16th century), Iberian-Italic painter
- Rubial (disambiguation)
