= Grif Eos =

Italian hang glider

Eos

General information
- Type: Hang glider
- National origin: Italy
- Manufacturer: Grif Italia
- Status: In production

History
- First flight: 1997

The Grif Eos is an Italian high-wing, single-place, hang glider, designed and produced by Grif Italia, of Castel Sant'Elia.

The aircraft is named for Eos the Greek goddess of the dawn.

== Design and development ==
The Eos is Grif's glider designed for competition and advanced cross country flying and has been progressively improved since its introduction in 1997. The Eos is built in three sizes designated by its approximate wing area in square meters.

The aircraft is made from aluminum tubing, with the wing covered in Dacron sailcloth. Its wing is cable braced from a single kingpost and has a nose angle of 132°.

== Variants ==
Eos 13
Small sized glider with a wing span of 9.7 m (31.8 ft) and an area of 13.2 m^{2} (142 sq ft). The pilot hook-in weight range is 45 to 70 kg (99 to 154 lb). Can be disassembled down to a size as small as 3.8 m (12.5 ft) in length.
Eos 14
Medium sized glider with a wing span of 10.1 m (33.1 ft) and an area of 14 m^{2} (150 sq ft). The pilot hook-in weight range is 65 to 80 kg (143 to 176 lb). Can be disassembled down to a size as small as 3.99 m (13.1 ft) in length.
Eos 15
Large sized glider with a wing span of 10.5 m (34.4 ft) and an area of 14.7 m^{2} (158 sq ft). The pilot hook-in weight range is 80 to 110 kg (176 to 243 lb). Can be disassembled down to a size as small as 4.08 m (13.4 ft) in length.

== Specifications (Eos 14) ==
Data from Bertrand and Grif

General characteristics

- Crew: one
- Wingspan: 10.1 m (33 ft 2 in)
- Wing area: 14 m^{2} (150 sq ft)
- Empty weight: 29.5 kg (65 lb)
- Gross weight: 109.5 kg (241 lb)

Performance

- Maximum speed: 100 km/h (62 mph, 54 kn)
- Cruise speed: 60 km/h (37 mph, 32 kn)
- Stall speed: 28 km/h (17 mph, 15 kn)
- Wing loading: 7.8 kg/m^{2} (1.6 lb/sq ft)
