= San Biagio, Orte =

Church building in Orte, Italy

Coordinates: 42.45982°N 12.38613°E

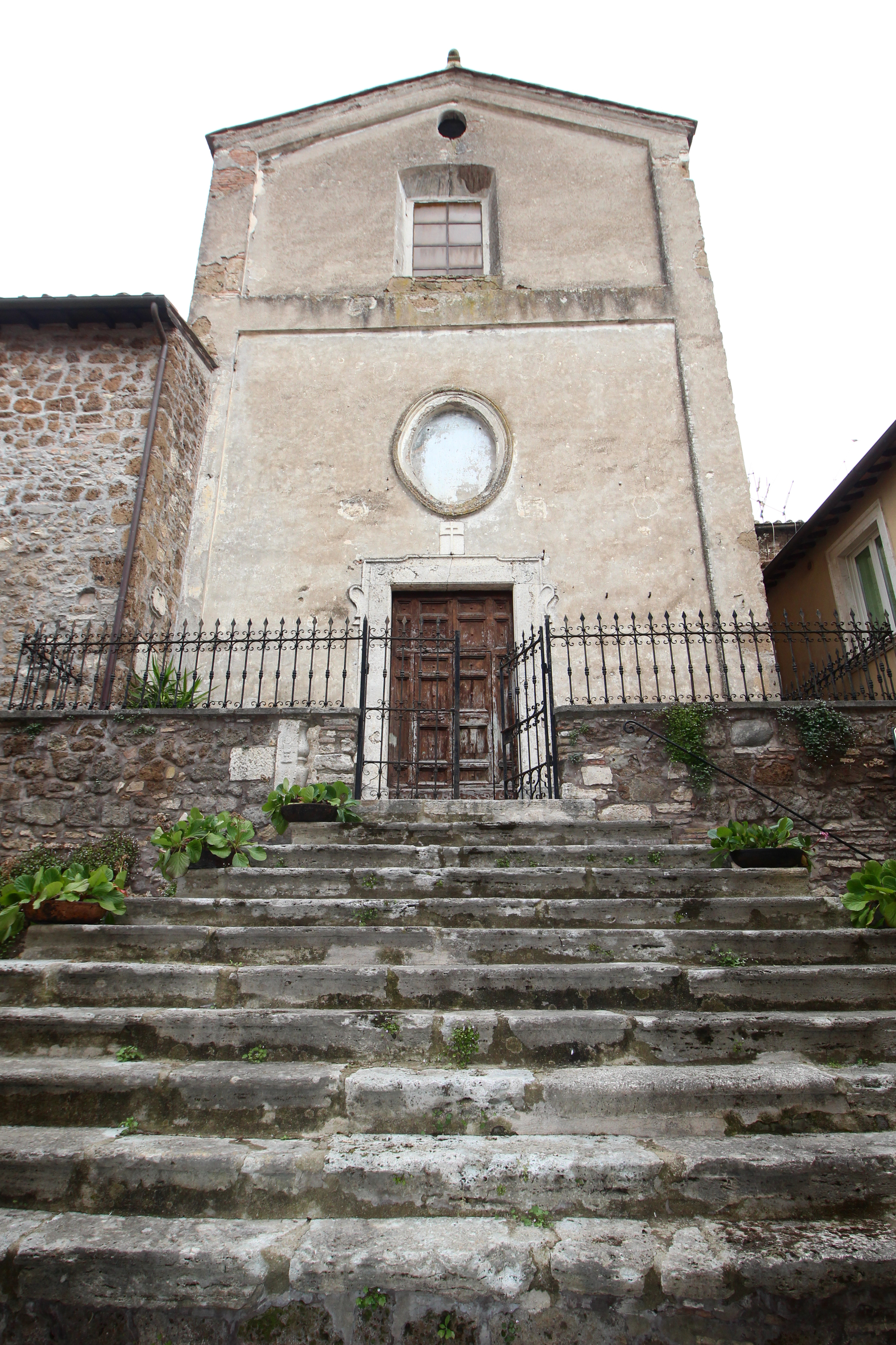
facade of church

San Biagio is a medieval Roman Catholic church in Orte in the province of Viterbo, region of Lazio, Italy.

== History ==
The neighborhood was named after the church. An inscription in its stone bell-tower is dated 1253. In 1352, The church and its property were assigned to the Order of Hospitallers of Santo Spirito in Saxia. They operated an adjacent hospital with remained open until 1613, when the property was transferred to a confraternity, the Congregazione dell’Annunziata. In 1754, the former Romanesque structure was nearly razed by a fire, and rebuilt in a sober Neoclassic style.
