= Grif H2000 =

Italian hang glider

H2000

General information
- Type: Hang glider
- National origin: Italy
- Manufacturer: Grif Italia
- Status: In production

History
- First flight: 1995

The Grif H2000 is an Italian high-wing, single and two-place family of hang gliders, designed and produced by Grif Italia, of Castel Sant'Elia.

== Design and development ==
The H2000 was designed for beginners and for flight training and has been progressively improved since its introduction in 1995 under the name Hobby. The H2000 is built in four sizes, with the single place versions designated by their approximate wing area in square meters.

The aircraft is made from aluminum tubing, with the wing covered in Dacron sailcloth. Its wing is cable braced from a single kingpost and has a nose angle of 120°. Unlike many training and beginner gliders the H2000 is not a single surface wing, but has about 50% double surface that encloses the crossbar.

The manufacturer provides a long list of options for the glider, including Hall wheels, ergonomic speed bar, rubber covered upright tubes and a Trilam wing leading edge.

== Variants ==
H2000 14
Small sized single-place glider with a wing span of 9.2 m (30.2 ft) and an area of 14.5 m^{2} (156 sq ft). The pilot hook-in weight range is 45 to 65 kg (99 to 143 lb). Can be disassembled down to a size as small as 3.57 m (11.7 ft) in length.
H2000 15
Medium sized single-place glider with a wing span of 9.6 m (31.5 ft) and an area of 15.5 m^{2} (167 sq ft). The pilot hook-in weight range is 65 to 90 kg (143 to 198 lb). Can be disassembled down to a size as small as 3.80 m (12.5 ft) in length.
H2000 16
Large sized single-place glider with a wing span of 10 m (32.8 ft) and an area of 16.5 m^{2} (178 sq ft). The pilot hook-in weight range is 85 to 110 kg (187 to 243 lb). Can be disassembled down to a size as small as 4.03 m (13.2 ft) in length.
H2000 Bi
Early model two-place glider with a wing span of 9.1 m (29.9 ft) and an area of 18.8 m^{2} (202 sq ft). The pilot hook-in weight range is 100 to 160 kg (220 to 353 lb).
H2000 CAB
Current model two-place glider with a wing span of 10.9 m (35.8 ft) and an area of 18.8 m^{2} (202 sq ft). The pilot hook-in weight range is 100 to 160 kg (220 to 353 lb). Can be disassembled down to a size as small as 4.13 m (13.5 ft) in length.

== Specifications (H2000 15) ==
Data from Bertrand and Grif

General characteristics

- Crew: one
- Wingspan: 9.6 m (31 ft 6 in)
- Wing area: 15.5 m^{2} (167 sq ft)
- Empty weight: 23.5 kg (52 lb)
- Gross weight: 113.5 kg (250 lb)

Performance

- Maximum speed: 85 km/h (53 mph, 46 kn)
- Cruise speed: 50 km/h (31 mph, 27 kn)
- Stall speed: 25 km/h (16 mph, 13 kn)
- Wing loading: 7.3 kg/m^{2} (1.5 lb/sq ft)
