= Museo Storico Nazionale dell'Arte Sanitaria =

- National Historic Museum of Healthcare Art
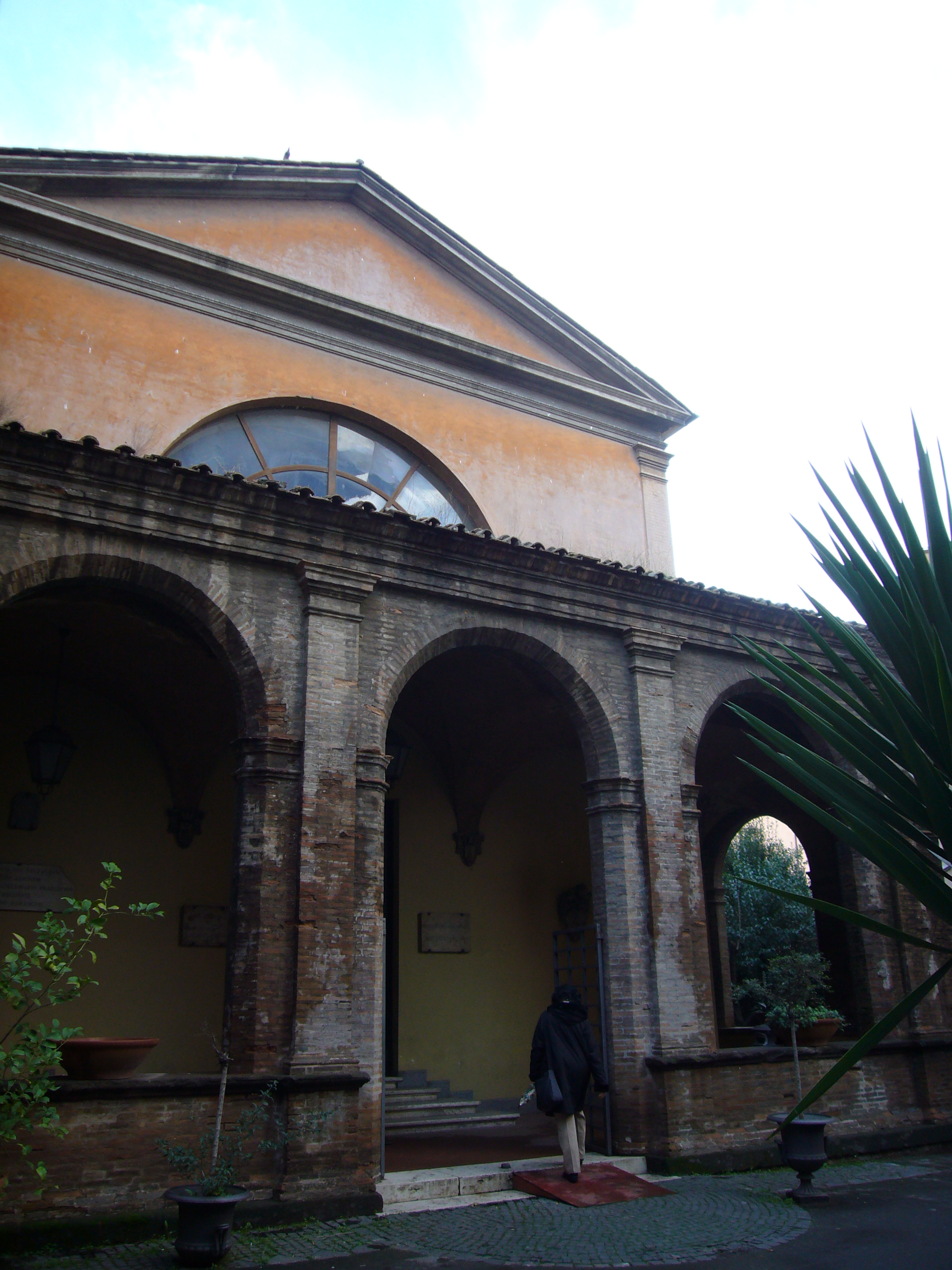
- Main entrance of the museum
- Click on the map for a fullscreen view
- Established: 1929
- Location: Lungotevere in Sassia 3, Rome, Italy
- Coordinates: 41°54′05″N 12°27′46″E
- Type: Science museum
- Public transit access: Ottaviano - San Pietro - Musei Vaticani Underground Station; Cipro Underground Station

The Museo Storico Nazionale dell'Arte Sanitaria (Italian for National Historic Museum of Healthcare Art) is located within the Ospedale di Santo Spirito in Sassia at 3, Lungotevere in Sassia in Rome (Italy).

== History ==
The museum originates from a former anatomical museum, increased with the collections of Giovanni Carbonelli and Pietro Capparoni. The collections of the early museum, having educational purposes, are still in place.

The idea for the creation of the current museum came from the International Exhibition of Retrospective Art, held in Rome in 1911. The Institute for the Historic Museum of Healthcare Art (ISIDAS) was founded in 1920 and in 1934 turned into the Academy of History of Healthcare Art (ASAS), having the foundation of the museum among its goals. In 1929 the Institute of Santo Spirito granted a wing of the hospital, located in the former Corsia Alessandrina.

The museum included historical collections, which were joined to the former collection from the 1911 Exhibition; in 1931 the collection of Giovanni Carbonelli was added, in 1939 that of the General A. Cavalli Mulinelli and later the ones of Giuseppe and Orlando Solinas.

== Description ==
The museum is located in a wing of the Ospedale di Santo Spirito in Sassia. It includes a well-provided library, with books dating from the 16th to the 20th centuries. The volumes include books printed in the 16th century by Aldo Manuzio and his son (cinquecentine), as well as recipe books, manuscripts dating back to the end of the 18th and the beginning of the 19th century, anthologies, diplomas, rules, etchings and anatomical tables. The library also houses four 18th-century oil paintings portraying doctors, among which Giuseppe Flajani and his son Gaetano. A walnut shelf, coming from a monastic chapter archive, is placed along the walls.

The museum is divided into the following rooms:

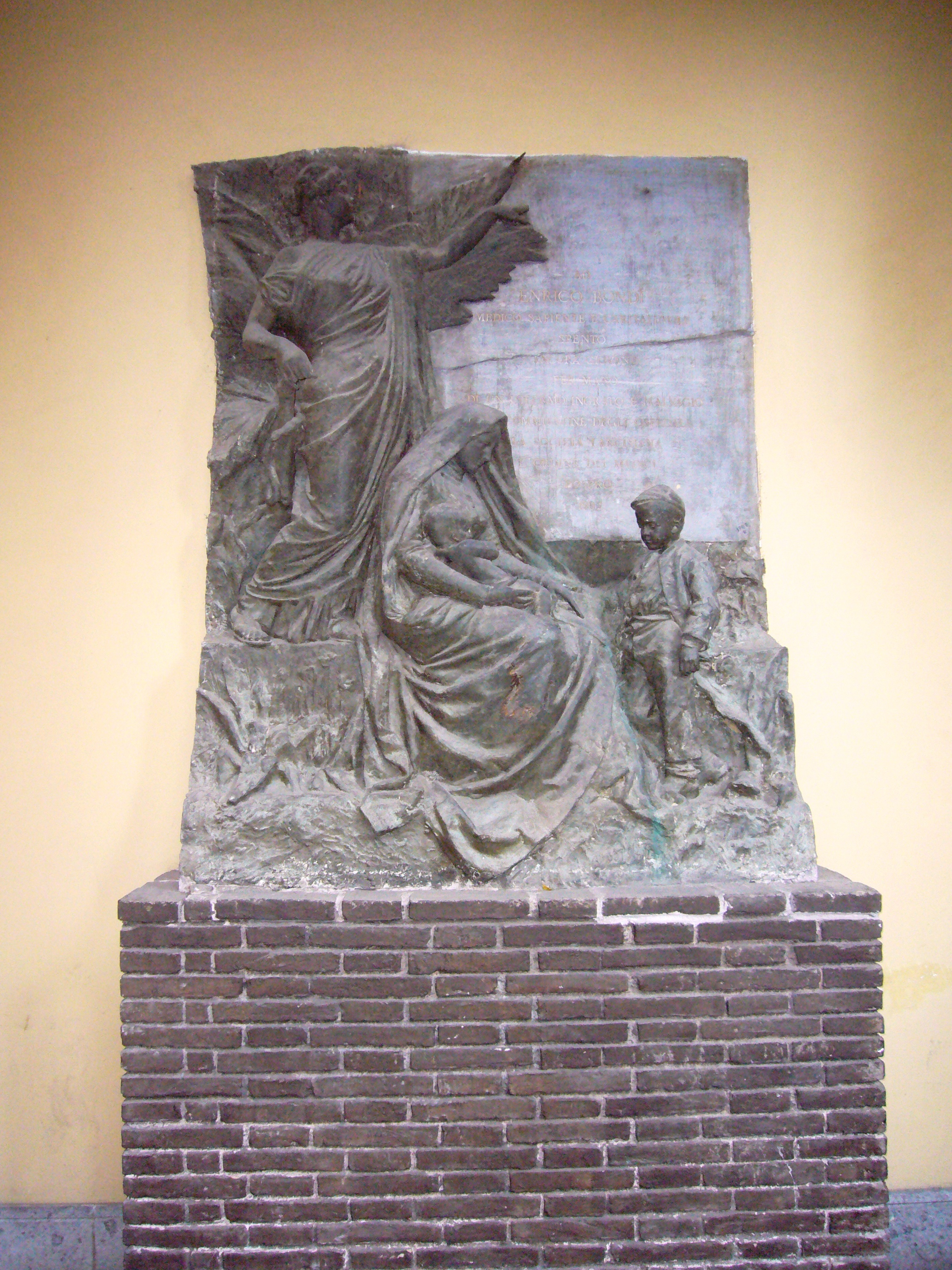
Monument to Enrico Biondi

- Portico

This room belongs to the Sala Alessandrina, built among 1665 and 1667 by Pope Alexander VII. The left wall is decorated with the coat of arms of Pope Pius IX, with a marble plaque dating back to 1896. Under the coat of arms is a marble mortar with angels at its sides. Another plaque commemorates the restoration carried out in 1797, when the tutor of the hospital was Giovanni Castiglioni; the room also houses some travertine emblems of the hospital itself. In a corner on the right there is a 1902 walled-in monument portraying doctor Enrico Biondi, killed by a crazy man.

- Sala Alessandrina

The room is perpendicular to the sixtine rooms that are the main body of the hospital. It is called Ospedaletto (English: "Little hospital"), because it was used as a shelter for wounded soldiers. The room is 108 ft 7 in long, 35 ft 4 in wide and 35 ft 8 in high. It could house 64 beds. Presently it serves as a conference hall. The walls are decorated by 19 anatomical tables dating back to the beginning of the 19th century, created by Antonio Serantony and Paolo Mascagni and belonged to the surgeon Guglielmo Riva. The room also houses a plaster statue with pedestal portraying Aesculapius.

- Grand staircase

It can be reached from the Sala Alessandrina. The monumental staircase gives access to the upper floor. On both sides are busts of famous physicians, among which Hippocrates and Giuseppe Maria Lancisi. On the right there is also an anatomical table with drainboard and grooves on its sides, on which the corpse of Goffredo Mameli was laid down; formerly it was housed in the death cell of Santissima Trinità dei Pellegrini. On the landing there is a wooden 17th-century chest, decorated with lion heads and used to store healing herbs; formerly it was housed in the spicery of the hospital. On both sides of the entrance door to the Sala Flajani there are medallions portraying Pope Pius VI and Francesco Saverio de Zelada together with plaques commemorating the founders of the museum and the first president of the Academy.

- Sala Flajani

The room, the first one after climbing the grand staircase, houses the ancient funds of the museum. The visitor not accustomed to medicine meets a horrific sight made of pathological deformities. They actually are anatomical-pathological preparations, dating back to the end of the 17th century, and natal deformities both dry and in formol. These deformities show alterations of the skeleton and of the blood vessels due to no more existing diseases, such as syphilis, as well as skulls of foetuses and little skeletons, including some macrocephalouses and a bicephalous. A pink-wooden Empire-style shelf exhibits a collection of waxworks manufactured by Giovan Battista Manfredini under the supervision of the anatomist Carlo Mondini. In the centre of the room there is an aedicula, that once conserved an 18th-century quina bark grinder by Giovanni Battista Cipriani from Siena, and a scale model of the Corsia Sistina of the hospital. On the right wall there is a collection of calculi of livers, kidneys and bladders of patients attended within the hospital during the 19th century. The room also houses the supposed skull of Pliny the Elder, found at the mouth of river Sarno at the beginning of the 20th century.

- Sala Capparoni

The left side of the room exhibits a collection of Etruscan, Roman, Greek and modern ex-votos concerning health. Showcase B5 displays a horn assembled on a bronze unicorn, while showcase B4 shows a bezoar, some portable pharmacies dating between 17th and 19th centuries and terra sigillata pills; showcase B2 shows an ivory anatomical Venus made in Germany in the 17th century, a Mauriceau syringe and a 17th-century enema. On the floor is laid down a funerary stele of P. Elius Curtianus, a freedman physician of Hadrian, while showcase B9 shows some ceramic-glaze tiles depicting the medical assistance, attributed to Luca della Robbia. On the bottom wall there are some glasses and pharmacy vases and, above them, some pictures portraying famous physicians; in the middle there is a portrait of Girolamo Fabrizi di Acquapendente. The room also houses a 19th-century electrotherapy machine, an antecedent of electroshock devices, and some tools belonged to Orlando Solinas and Giuseppe Bovio.

- Sala Carbonelli

On the right side there is the wooden desk, with its access stepladder, belonged to Lancisi, from which he taught his medicine lessons or held conferences and scientific meetings. On the bottom wall there is a picture of the central and peripheral nervous system, made by Luigi Raimondi in 1844, while, on the opposite wall, a picture with the same subject is due to Stefano Fattocchio. Showcase C1 displays devices used by ancient surgeons for the most common operations. Showcase C2 houses some survey devices, among which vaginal and rectal specula. Showcase C3 displays the amputated hand of a 13-years girl dead in 1881. Showcases C5 and C6 show other ex-vota, surgery devices and archaeological finds made of plaster and iron; there is also a collection of microscopes of various ages and sizes, two prints representing "The clothing of Medicine" by anonymous and a "Young girl affected by disease" by Francesco Bartolozzi, pharmacy glasses and vases, Roman lacrymatories, matulae, bowls for bloodletting, urine bottles, a French baby bottle, a Leyden jar, a device by Amedeo Avogadro, some obstetrical devices from Lateran Hospital, a pharmacy wooden press from a hospital in Turin, a print depicting a plague physician, the 16th-century sign of a barber's and surgeon's, a colour print showing a physician, a 16th-century wooden statue showing an opium-addicted man from a Piedmont pharmacy, an oil picture showing the anatomical theatre of the Ospedale della Consolazione, an oil picture showing a plague scene, two devices for anaesthesia of the beginning of the 19th century, a piece of furniture with the coat of arms of the House of Savoy, some book holders carrying 18th-century herbaria.

- Pharmacy

Is the recreation of an 18th-century pharmacy, with terracotta paving and coffer ceiling. The wooden counter rises in front of the access door; a scale, used by chemist to dose powders, is hung over it. On the shelves there are pharmacy vases used to keep the medicaments: most of them come from the spiceries of Santo Spirito, San Giacomo and Santa Maria della Consolazione in Rome.

- Alchemic laboratory

The setting of the laboratory intend to symbolize magic and superstition. The ceiling is decorated with a stuffed crocodyle; the laboratory houses a cast of the Porta Alchemica in the gardens of Piazza Vittorio Emanuele II, a 17th-century stone container, with cap and bolt, used to prepare the theriac, a chimney with an alchemist oven, an alembic and a still. The room houses other alchemist devices, such as bells used to cover formulations or collect gases and a device used to separate immiscible liquids such as oil and water.

== Notes ==
Preceded by Museo Nazionale Romano	Landmarks of Rome; Museo Storico Nazionale dell'Arte Sanitaria	Succeeded by Museum of Contemporary Art of Rome
