= Santo Spirito in Sassia =

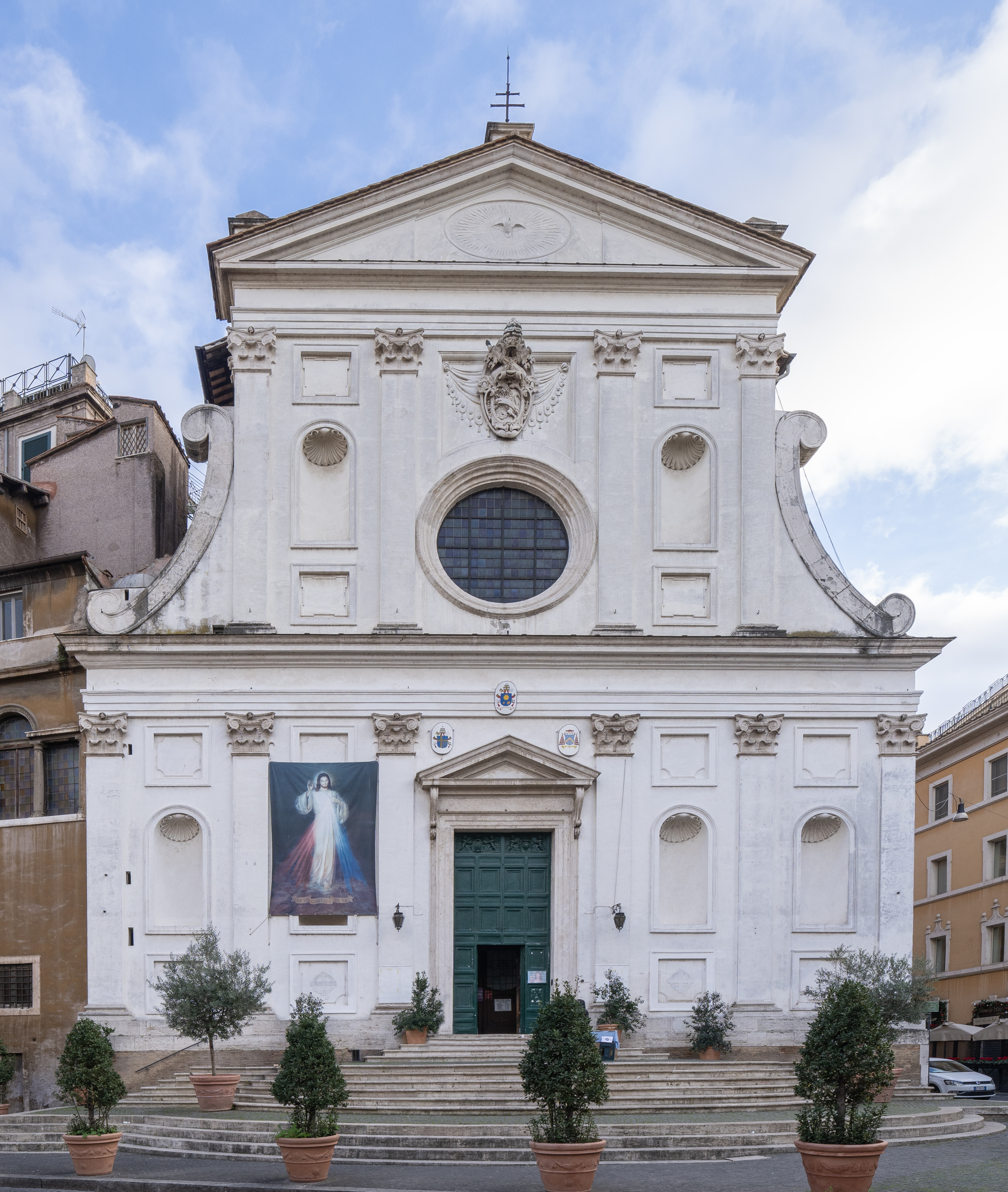
- Click on the map to see marker.
- 41°54′05″N 12°27′40″E
- Location: Via dei Penitenzieri 12, Borgo, Rome
- Country: Italy
- Denomination: Catholic
- Website: divinamisericordia.it

History
- Status: Titular church, German national church
- Dedication: Holy Spirit

Architecture
- Architect(s): Antonio da Sangallo the Younger, or Baldassare Peruzzi
- Style: Renaissance
- Groundbreaking: 1538
- Completed: 1545

Church of the Holy Spirit in the Saxon District (Italian: La chiesa di Santo Spirito in Sassia) is a 12th-century titular church in Rome, Italy. It is in Borgo Santo Spirito, a street which got its name from the church, placed in the southern part of Rione Borgo and has been connected since its foundation to the adjacent Ospedale di Santo Spirito in Sassia. The current holder of the titulus is Cardinal-Deacon Dominique Mamberti. It has been the official sanctuary of Divine Mercy since 1994.

== History ==
The heraldic device of the Church of Santo Spirito in Sassia

The church stands on the site of King Ine of Wessex's Schola Saxonum, or "Saxon School", a charitable institution for West Saxon pilgrims. According to Roger of Wendover, Ine founded the Schola Saxonum in AD 727. It included a hostel and a chapel dedicated to Santa Maria. In mediaeval times a substantial number of pilgrims from Wessex, including fighting men, traveled the Via Francigena from Canterbury to Rome.

The hospice and church were gutted by fire in 817, were sacked by Muslim raiders in 846, and were again burned in 852. It was rebuilt in the 12th century and subsequently restored several times. In 1475 Pope Sixtus IV commissioned joining the church to the nearby Hospital of the Holy Spirit for foundlings (which Pope Innocent III had built and whose history is given in wall-paintings in the church's sacristy) and given a bell tower. In 1538–1545, Antonio da Sangallo the Younger, or Baldassare Peruzzi, rebuilt the church after it had been damaged during the Sack of Rome. An organ, which survives, was added in 1547. In 1585–1590, Pope Sixtus V had the exterior restored, giving the church its present façade by Ottavio Mascherino, inspired by a design of Sangallo. This facade has two stories, with Corinthian pilasters dividing the lower one into five sections, and the upper divided into three sections. In the upper middle section is a circular window, and above that is the coat-of-arms of Pope Sixtus V. The façade is crowned by a pediment. It is a typical example of Renaissance architecture.

In the stational procession for the first Sunday after the Octave of the Epiphany, instituted by Pope Innocent III (1198–1216), a procession carried the veil of Saint Veronica from Saint Peter's Basilica, and the Pope celebrated Mass in this church. Indulgences were granted to those who took part, and money was distributed to the poor.

The inscriptions found in Santo Spirito in Sassia, a valuable source illustrating the history of the church, have been collected and published by Vincenzo Forcella.

== Art and architecture ==
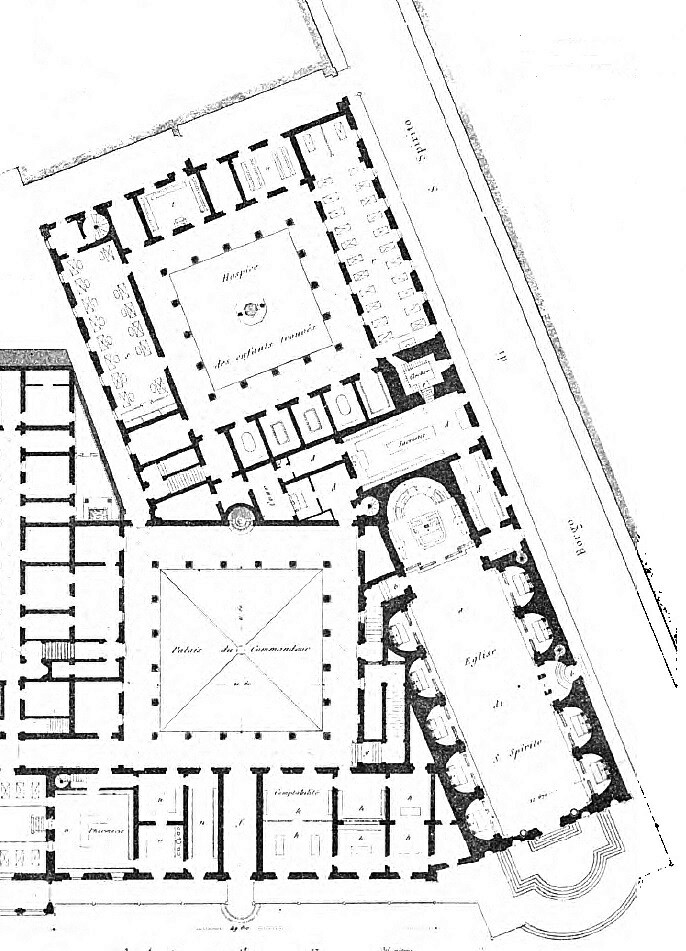
Plan of Church and adjacent hospital

The church has a single nave, and ten apsidal chapels along the sides. The counter-facade has a Visitation (1545) by Marco Pino, and a Conversion of St. Paul begun by Francesco Salviati and completed by Francesco Rubiale. The first chapel to the right in the apse, has a fresco of the Pentecost by the Florentine Jacopo Zucchi and his brother. The second chapel has an Assumption by Livio Agresti, who also painted the Trinity in the fourth chapel as well as frescoes in the third chapel. The fifth chapel has an Annunciation and an Ascent (1570) by Giuseppe Valeriano. The sacristy is decorated by stories of the Schola Saxonum by Guidobaldo Abbatini. The apse is frescoed (1583) by both Jacopo and Francesco Zucchi. The fifth chapel on the left has a Martyrdom of St. John the Evangelist by Marcello Venusti. The second and first chapels contain paintings by Cesare Nebbia, including a Coronation of the Virgin.

== Burials ==
- Burgred of Mercia

== Cardinal-Deacons ==
Since the 1991 consistory of Pope John Paul II, the church has been used as a Deaconry with a Cardinal assigned as its Cardinal Protector (a term created by Pope Paul VI in 1966).

- Fiorenzo Angelini (28 June 1991 – 22 November 2014)
- Dominique Mamberti (14 Feb 2015 – present)

== See also ==
- Basilica of Sant'Elia, a church in Castel Sant'Elia whose monastery was held by the Canons of Santo Spirito in Sassia.
- Ospedale di Santo Spirito in Sassia.

== Sources ==
- Emilio Lavagnino, La chiesa di Santo Spirito in Sassia: e il mutare del gusto a Roma al tempo del Concilio di Trento (Rome: Banco di Santo Spirito, 1962).
- Louise Smith Bross, The Church of Santo Spirito in Sassia: A Study in the Development of Art, Architecture and Patronage in Counter Reformation Rome [PhD thesis, University of Chicago, 1994].
- Sivigliano Alloisi and Luisa Cardilli Alloisi, Santo Spirito in Saxia (Rome: Istituto nazionale di studi romani, Palombi Editori 2002).
- Gianfranco Grieco and Jòzef Bart, Santo Spirito in Sassia (Gorle: Elledici: Editrice Velar, 2007). [available in English]
