= Nonnosus =

Italian prior and saint (c. 500 – 560 AD)

Saint Nonnosus
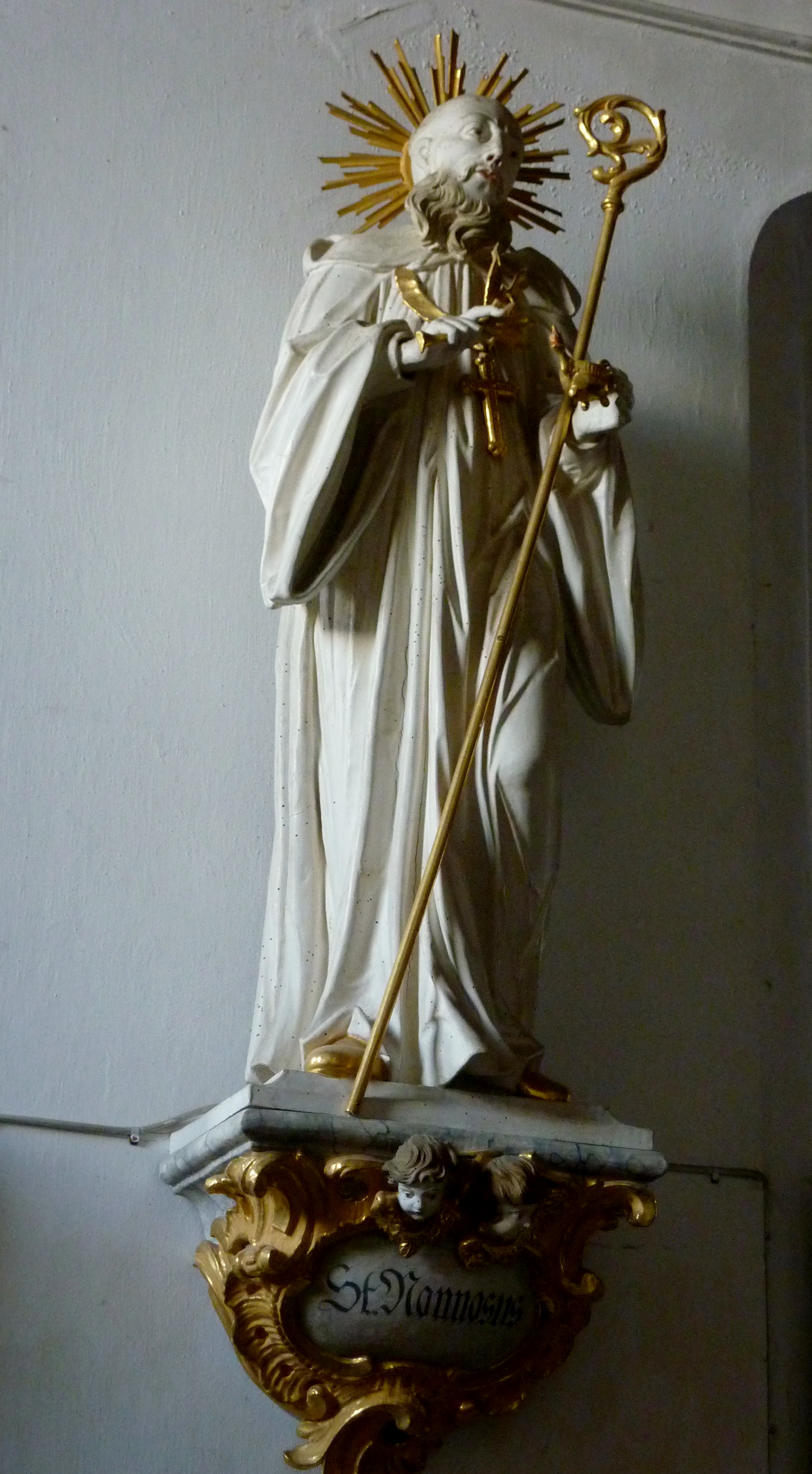
- Nonnosus statue, Thierhaupten Abbey
- Born: Italy?
- Died: 560? Monte Soratte?
- Venerated in: Roman Catholic Church; Eastern Orthodox Church
- Major shrine: Freising; Bamberg; Monte Soratte
- Feast: September 2
- Attributes: oil lamp or hanging lamp; rock; depicted sometimes as a Benedictine monk (in black habit) or as an abbot with a staff or as a deacon wearing a dalmatic
- Patronage: Freising (co-patron); Castel Sant'Elia; dioceses of Sutri and Nepi; invoked in Germany against diseases of the kidneys; invoked against physical defects, back pains, and school-related students' crises

Saint Nonnosus (c. 500 – 560 AD), also Nonosius, was a prior at the San Silvestre monastery on Monte Soratte north of Rome and later a monk at Suppentonia, near Civita Castellana. He was a contemporary of Saint Benedict of Nursia. Alban Butler has written that “so little information has survived about Nonnosus that he is not especially interesting in himself.” His name does not appear in any ancient martyrology.

A deacon Nonnosus is mentioned in a 12th-century collection of legends from Carinthia, Austria. His cult was strong in Bavaria, where relics are kept in the crypt of Freising Cathedral. Veneration of Nonnosus was also established at Monte Soratte in the 1650s, due to the efforts of Andrea di San Bonaventura, a Cistercian monk, and in 1661 some of his relics returned to Monte Soratte and Nonnosus' cult spread across central Italy. It is highly likely that the legends of two different persons had been merged into one by then.

== Sources ==
The sole source on Nonnosus' life is Pope Gregory I (r. 590-604), who wrote about Saint Nonnosus after being asked by some friends to create a compendium of miracle stories associated with Italian saints. Maximian, bishop of Syracuse, provided Gregory with information about Nonnosus, after Gregory had forgotten the details of the stories associated with Nonnosus -details in turn acquired from Laurio, an old monk of the monastery of Suppentonia. Laurio had been a friend of Nonnosus while the two lived the monastic life there under the Abbot St. Anastasius of Suppentonia. According to Gregory, Nonnosus was a particularly good-natured man and was buried at Monte Soratte.

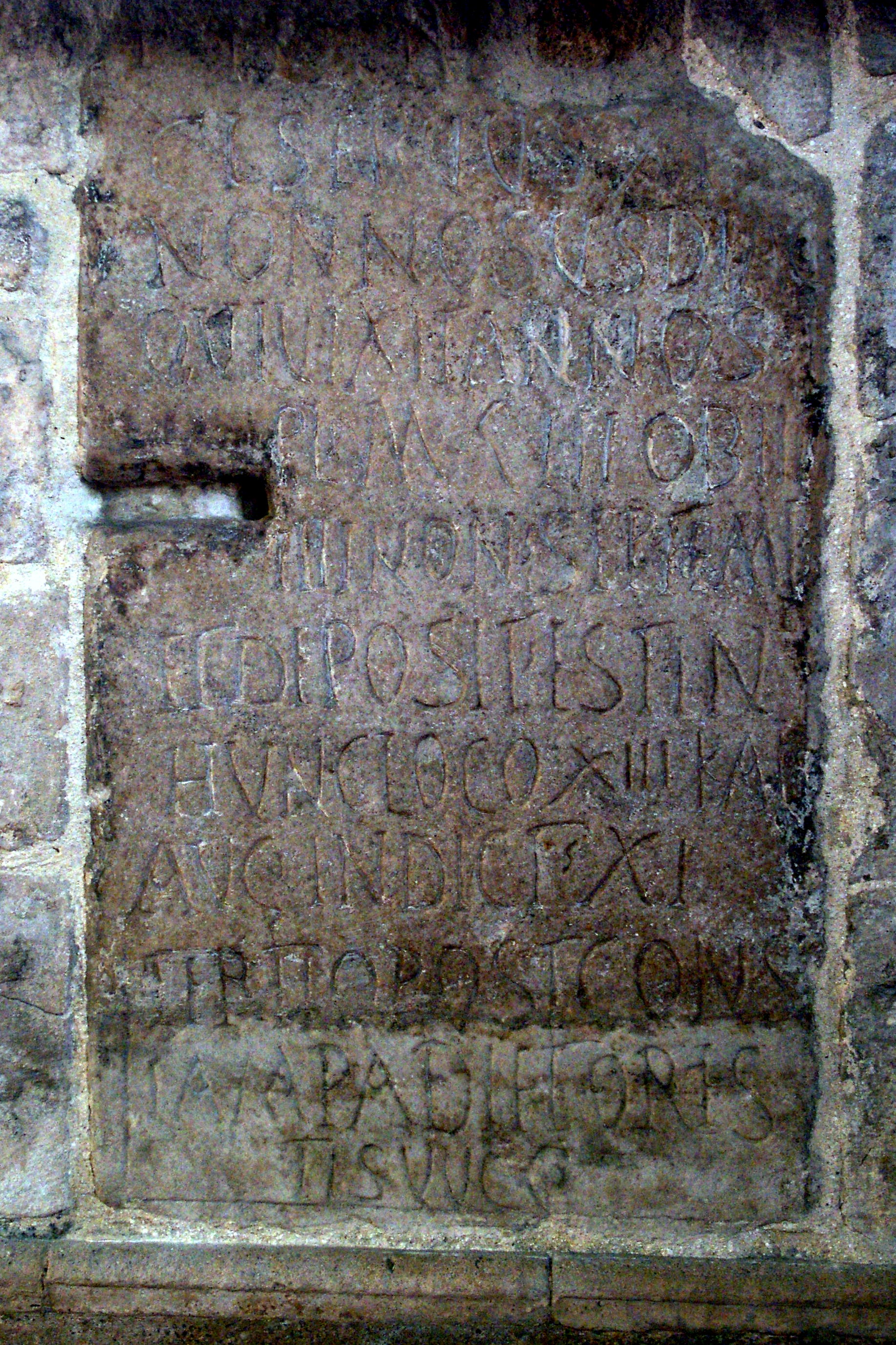
Inscription on the tombstone associated with Nonnosus, Molzbichl Church

A re-interpretation for the origins of Nonnosus was posited by archaeological excavations at the village of Molzbichl, near Spittal an der Drau in Carinthia. There, a tombstone carries an early Christian inscription plate that reads: “Here rests the servant of Christ, Nonnosus, deacon, who lived more or less for 103 years. He died on September 2 at this place died on July 20...three years after the consulate of the illustrious men Lampadius and Orestes [i.e. in 533].” The plate may have been translated to the church from the nearby ancient city of Teurnia (at present-day St. Peter in Holz in Lendorf), where Nonnosus could have served as a deacon in the troubled border area near the Danube. The area of St. Peter in Holz was, since the days of Emperor Arnulf, under the jurisdiction of the bishops of Freising, so relics could have been transferred to Freising from there.

== Legends ==
Miracles told of Nonnosus, as recorded by St. Gregory, state that Nonnosus removed an enormous rock that had occupied land on which he wanted to grow cabbage –fifty pairs of oxen had not been able to move it; that he miraculously restored a glass lamp that had been shattered against the floor; and that he completely filled several receptacles with olive oil after a particularly bad harvest for the olive crop. The legends told of him tell of his ability to calm his abbot, who was a despotic and irascible man.

== Veneration ==
When Monte Soratte was attacked by Muslim forces at the end of the 9th century, Nonnosus’ relics were taken to Suppentonia, and then, around 1050, to Freising in Bavaria. This occurred during the episcopate of Bishop Nitker of Freising (r. 1039 -1052). A fire damaged the cathedral of Freising in 1159, and in 1161, while the foundations of the church were being dug, remains of three people were discovered, identified as the relics of Nonnosus, and two other saints: Alexander and Justin. The relics were reburied in the crypt of the cathedral, after being translated there by Bishop Albert I of Freising (1158–1184) in the presence of Archbishop Eberhard of Salzburg.

In 1708, they were rediscovered again when a brick wall collapsed, but no one could remember their origin. Nevertheless, the Freising prince-bishop Johann Franz von Eckher (1696–1727) identified them as belonging to Nonnosus and buried the relics in 1709 with great pomp in the crypt again, and the cathedral became a popular pilgrimage site. Nonnosus' head was taken to Bamberg at an uncertain date.

Churches dedicated to Nonnosus stand not only in Molzbichl and St. Peter in Holz, but also in Berg im Drautal, Hermagor, and Sappada (Pladen) in Italy. In Germany, Nonnosus was prayed to by sufferers from diseases of the kidneys. At Freising, these sufferers performed a ritual that involved crawling three times around Nonnosus' sarcophagus on all fours, while praying for the saint’s help, a ritual called the reptatio per cryptam or Durchschlüpfsbrauch.
