= Basilica di Sant'Elia =

Basilica in Castel Sant'Elia, Italy

Coordinates: 42°14′58.6″N 12°22′23.1″E

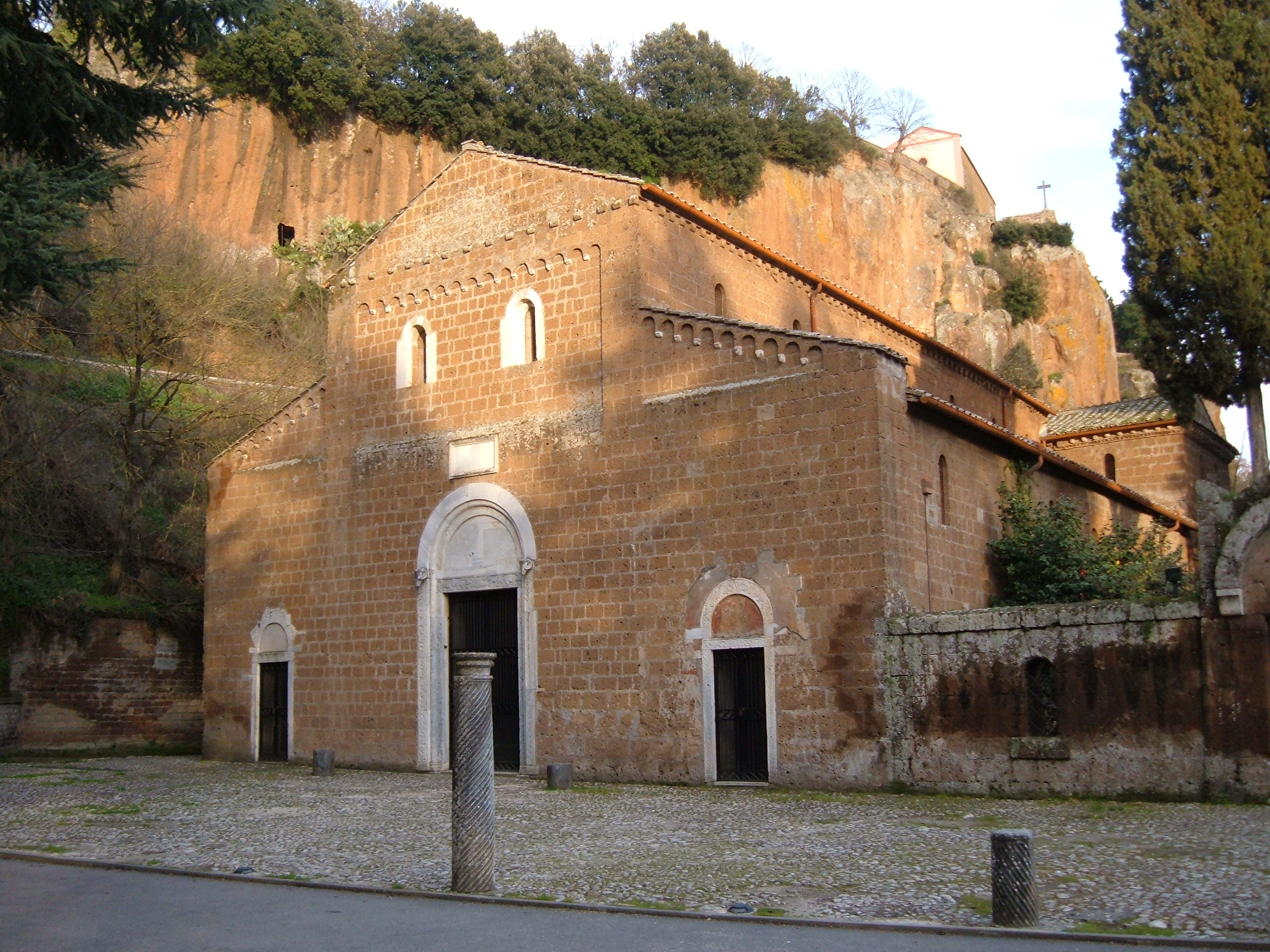
Façade of the basilica.

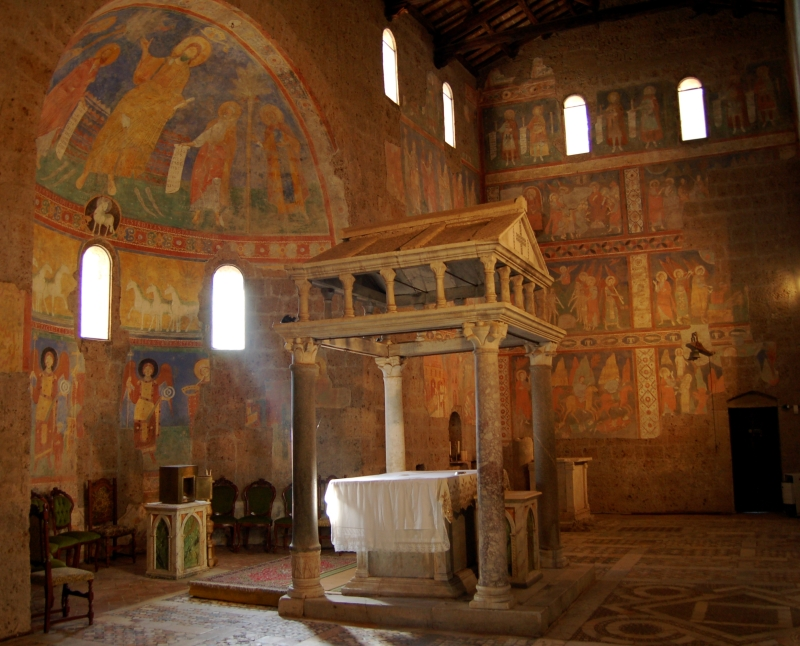
The cyborium with part of the frescoes.

The Basilica di Sant'Elia is a basilica in Castel Sant'Elia, northern Latium, central Italy.

== History ==
The church originates from a monastery founded here in 520 by Anastasius, a notary in the Roman court. In the early 11th century the abbot Elia built here a basilica which was mentioned, among the others, by Pope Gregory VII in 1176 and by Innocent III in 1211.

In 1607 a fallen tuff rock damaged the left side wall, and the church was subsequently restored at the expenses of the Farnese family, who owned the basilica from 1540 to 1649. In 1740 a period of decline began, due to the construction of a parish church in the town, which ended in the 19th century when Pius IX had architect Virginio Vespignani restore the edifice. Other restorations date to 1960 (frescoes and ceiling), 1997 (mosaic pavement) and 2003 (apse and crypt pavement).

== Description ==
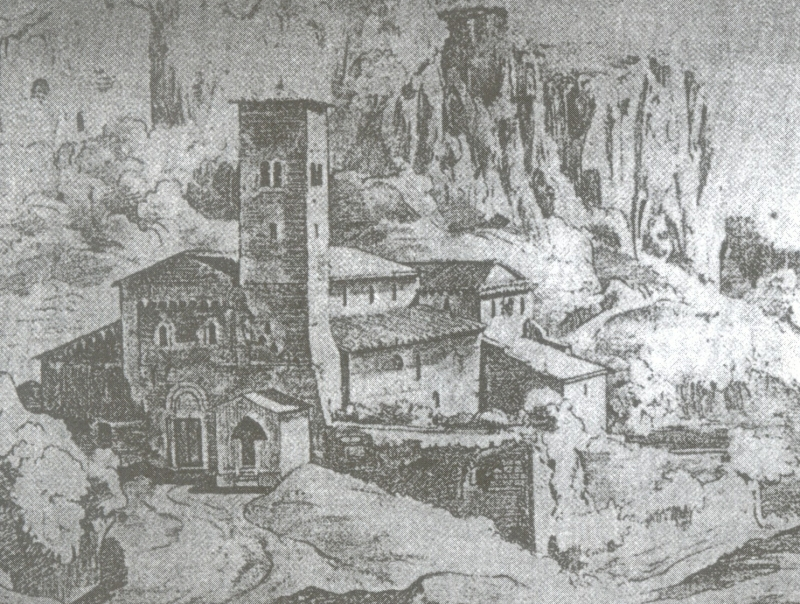
The basilica in 1826 with the bell tower still visible.

The basilica of Sant'Elia is a Romanesque structure with a nave and two aisles, and a transept. The columns separating the nave's bays were likely taken from ancient Roman buildings. The raised transept is accessed through three steps from three arcades. The façade has three portals, the central one having remains of a painting in its lunette.

The apse was entirely frescoed around 1000. The paintings feature the Redeemer with Saints (including Paul, Peter and two unidentified ones). Below them are twelve lambs, symbolizing the apostles, who walk towards the Lamb of God. The lower part is occupied by a procession of Virgins with crowns, which were originally offered to the Madonna: this part of the fresco is now lost, only two archangels remaining.

The right side of the transept lost its frescoes after the 17th century reconstruction, while the left section had frescoes of the Apocalypse with, below, a procession of prophets and Old Men who raise veiled golden cups and march towards the Lamb of God. Other scenes includes the death of St. Anastasius and the Archangel Michael calling Anastasius.

The high altar is surmounted by a ciborium decorated with a Cosmatesque cross and four columns. Of the Schola Cantorum, only the ambo survives today. The transept and part of the nave feature a Cosmatesque pavement. The crypt has two rooms, the largest housing Anastasius' tomb.

The church had originally a large bell tower, built in 1260 by the canons of Santo Spirito in Sassia who had received the monastery by Pope Alexander IV two years before. It was destroyed in 1855.
