= Anastasius of Suppentonia =

Saint Anastasius of Suppentonia

Abbot
- Died: 570 AD; Castel Sant'Elia
- Venerated in: Roman Catholic Church
- Feast: 11 January
- Patronage: Castel Sant'Elia

Saint Anastasius of Suppentonia (d. 570 AD), or Anastasius of Castel Sant'Elia, was an abbot of Suppentonia (Castel Sant’Elia). A source on Anastasius’ life is St. Gregory the Great, who wrote that an angel appeared to summon Anastasius and all of the abbot's monks. Anastasius and all of his monks all subsequently died one after the other within the next eight days.

St. Nonnosus was one of Anastasius’ monks.
