= Pedro Roviale =

Spanish painter in Italy

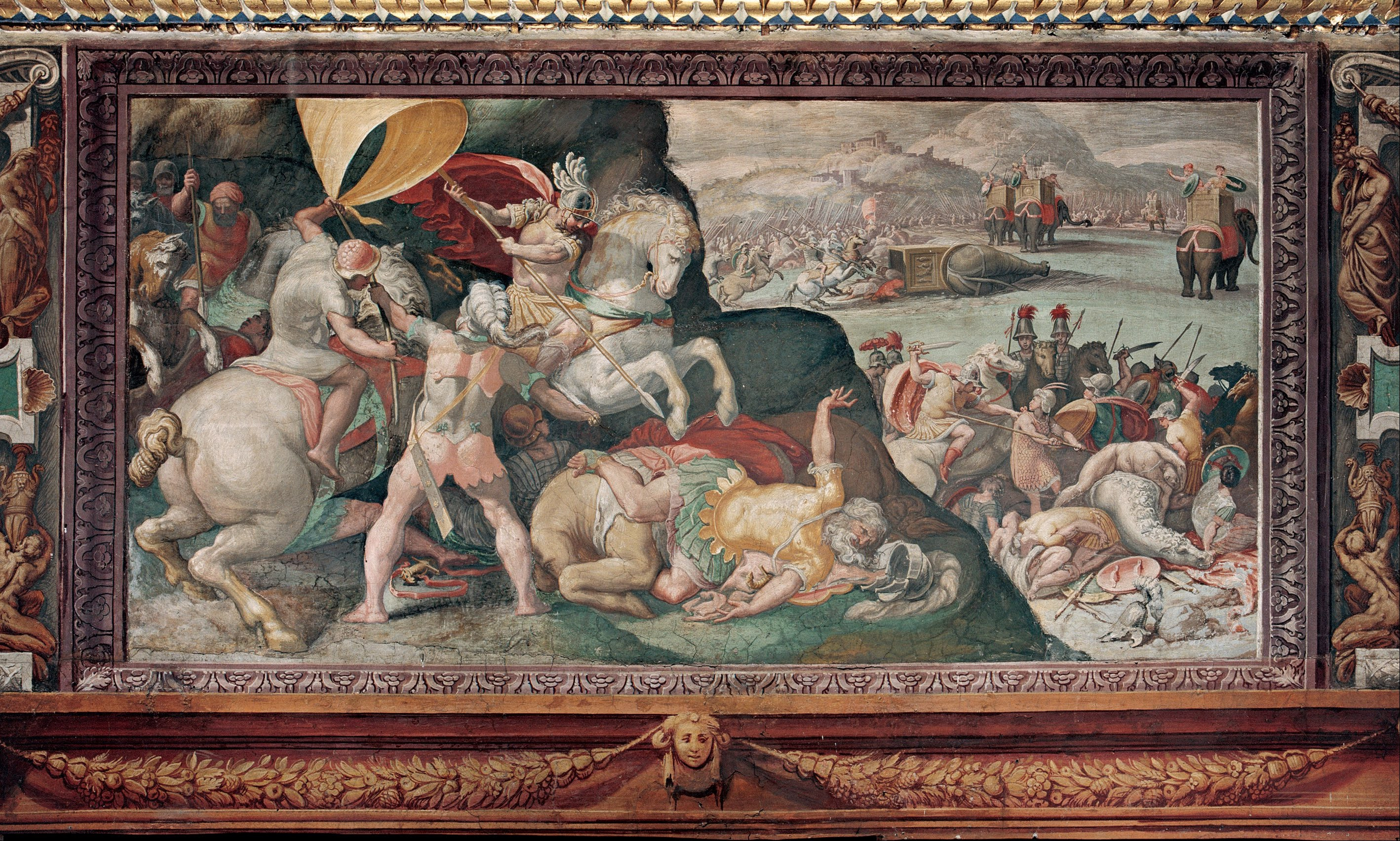
Fresco Battle of Zama, Musei Capitolini, Rome

Pedro Roviale (or de Rubiales etc) (c. 1511 - 1582) was a Spanish painter of the Renaissance period, active in Naples, Italy from circa 1548 to 1556. It is now generally accepted that he was the same person as Francesco Ruviali who is recorded working in Rome around 1544 to 1546.

There are a plethora of other names used by sources, including Roviale Spagnuolo ("Spanish Roviale") and variants, and Il Polidorino due to his attachment to the style of Polidoro da Caravaggio (d 1543). According to Bernardo de' Dominici, the biographer of Neapolitan artists, he was a native of Spain, from Alburquerque, Badajoz, Extremadura, but brought up in Naples.

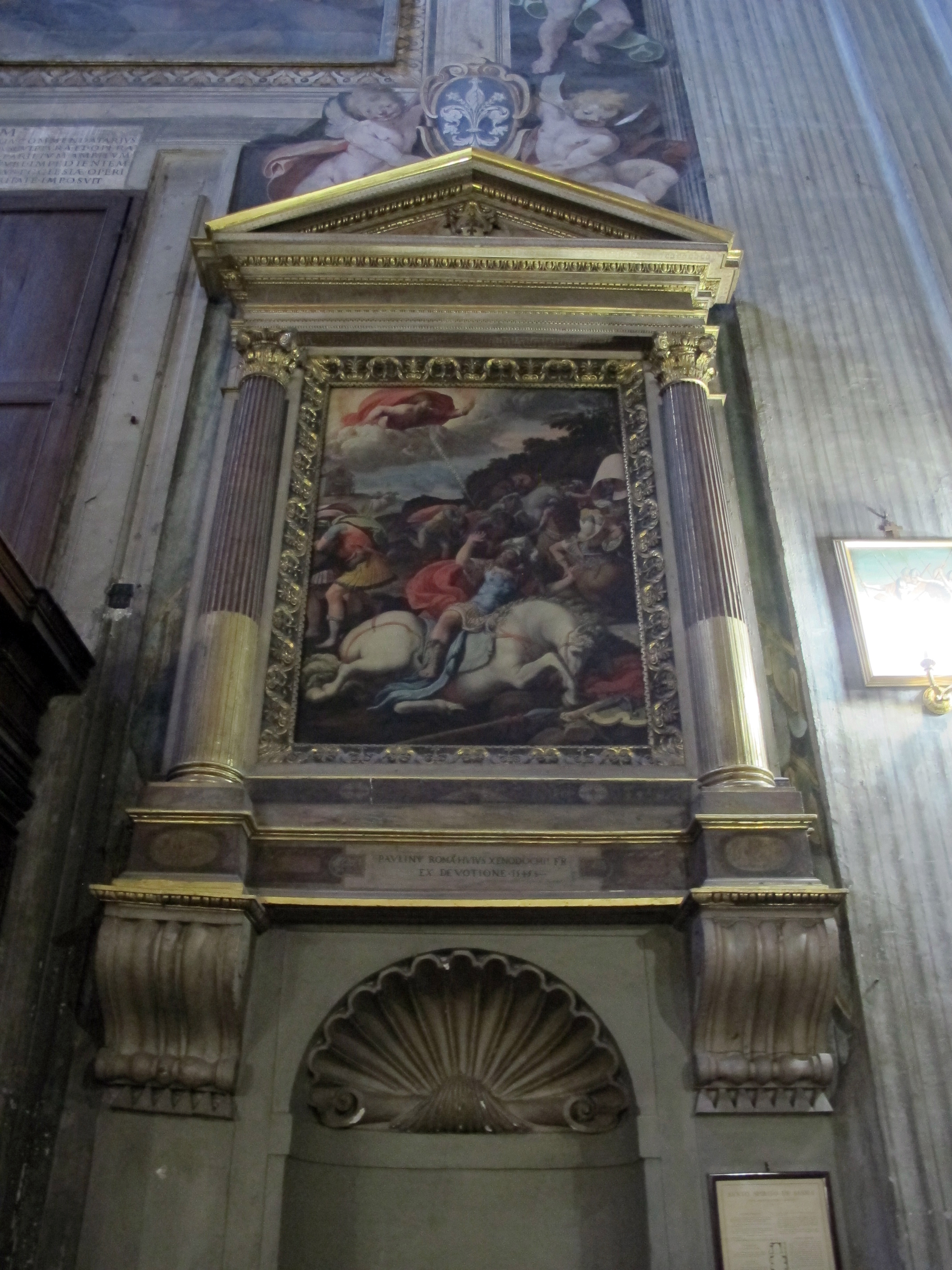
Santo Spirito in Sassia, Rome, Conversion of St Paul (1545)

== Works ==
In Rome he collaborated with Giorgio Vasari on frescos for the Palazzo della Cancelleria, and probably the Sala del Fregio in the Palazzo dei Conservatori on top of the Capitoline Hill. Vasari mentions him and describes him as a follower of Francesco Salviati. He painted an altarpiece in Santo Spirito in Sassia, Rome of the Conversion of St Paul (1545; still in situ).

In Naples "Maniera modernity and respectable artistic merit appear together in Naples for the first time after Vasari's important sojourn of 1544/5 in the person of a Spaniard, Pedro Roviale" according to Sydney Joseph Freedberg. His principal works at Naples are a Dead Christ, with the Virgin Mary and St. John in the chapel of the Courts of Justice; and the Descent from the Cross painted for the chapel in the Castel Capuano, where he also painted panels in the ceiling. There are also a number of easel paintings, also of religious subjects.
