= Ospedale di Santo Spirito in Sassia =

Convention center and former hospital in Rome

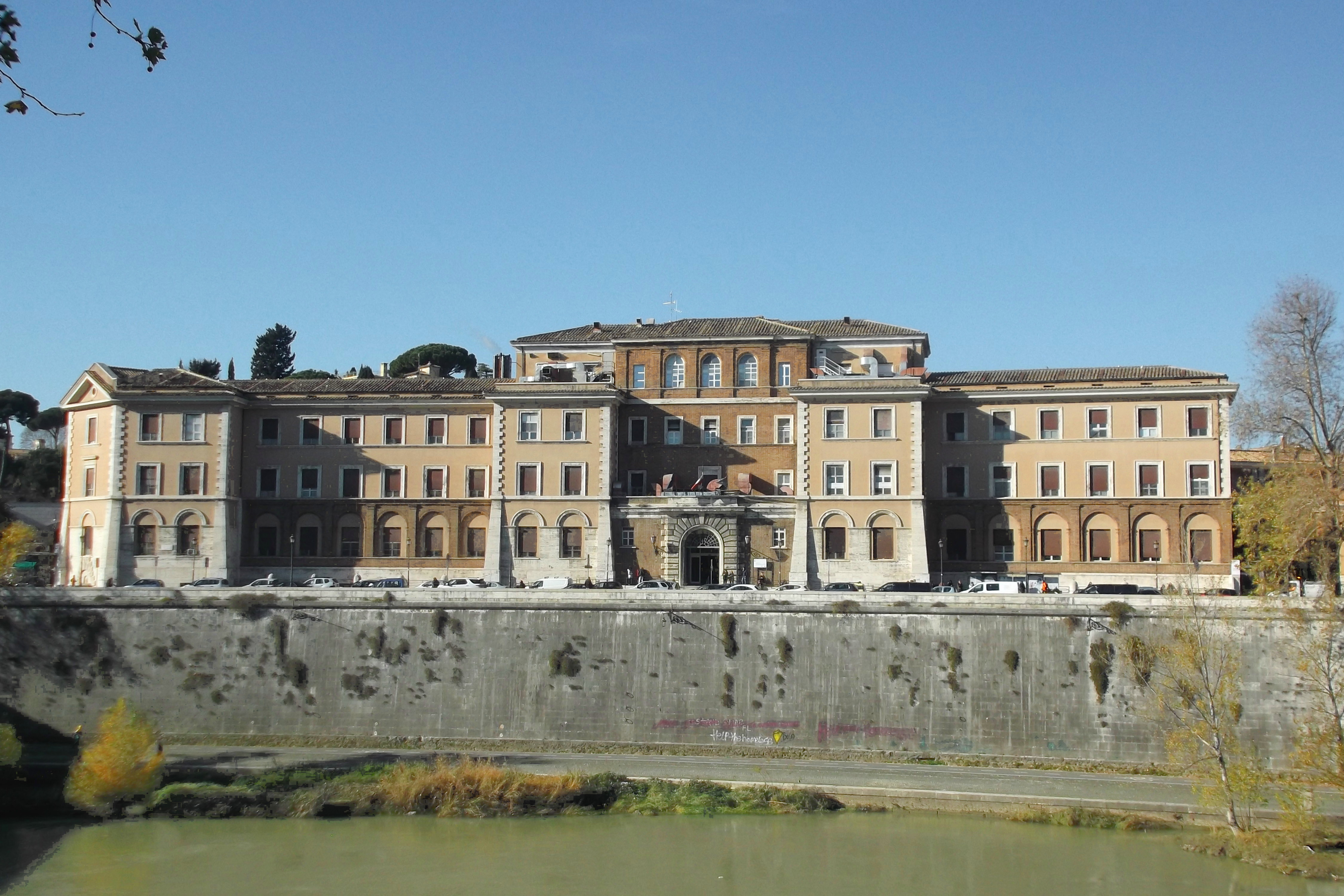
- Front view of the most recent building
- Click on the map for a fullscreen view

Geography
- Location: Lungotevere in Sassia 1, I-00193, Rome, Italy
- Coordinates: 41°54′05.54″N 12°27′45.60″E

History
- Founded: 727

Links
- Website: www.aslroma1.it
- Lists: Hospitals in Italy

The Hospital of the Holy Spirit (Italian: L'Ospedale di Santo Spirito in Sassia) is the oldest hospital in Europe, located in Rome, Italy. It now serves as a convention center. The complex lies in rione Borgo, east of Vatican City and next to the modern Ospedale di Santo Spirito (which continues its tradition). The hospital was established on the site of the former Schola Saxonum, a part of the complex houses the Museo Storico.

== Premise ==
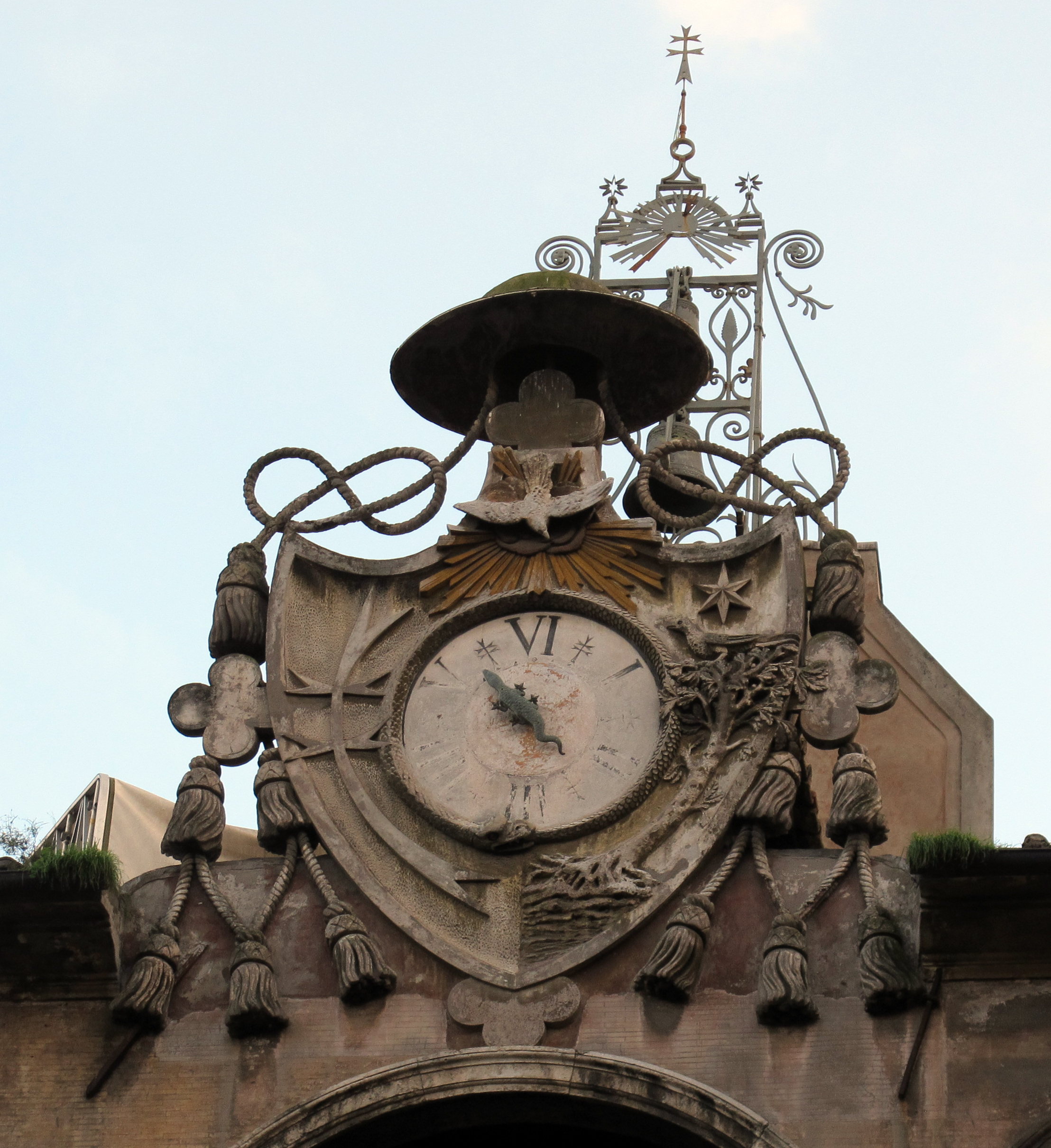
The clock with salamander in the Courtyard of the Well

=== Christian brotherhood ===
Christianity gave rise to a new philanthropic feeling in men, as evidenced by the words of Tertullian; "We are like brothers by right of nature, our common Mother". Tertullian himself railes against the pagans and their way of treating the sick, mostly left to their ungrateful fate. It is reasonable, therefore, to attribute the birth of hospitals to the push given by Christianity which, even in the darkness of the Catacombs, did not fail to "be towards the most needy". And so the feeling of love, charity, piety and concern for the sick received a healthy and lively impulse with the change of perspective offered by the Christian religion. This feeling finally turned into practice in 325 AD with the First Council of Nicaea in Bithynia where the 300 or more of bishops gathered there established that "in every city houses called Xenodochi and hospices for pilgrims should be built, for the poor and for the sick." These dwellings were entrusted to the bishops of the various dioceses: each of them was considered "father of the poor" and in this regard we find in the Apostolic Constitutions "O bishop, take care of the poor, as a minister of God, distributing to everyone the necessary time, to widows, orphans, derelicts, the sick and the unfortunate". After the First Council of Nicaea the Church was strongly committed to the creation of brephotrophs for exposed infants, orphanages, gerontocomia for the non self-sufficient elderly, as well as Xenodochi and Nosocomi, for pilgrims.

== History ==
=== From the Schola of the Saxons to the birth of the Hospital ===
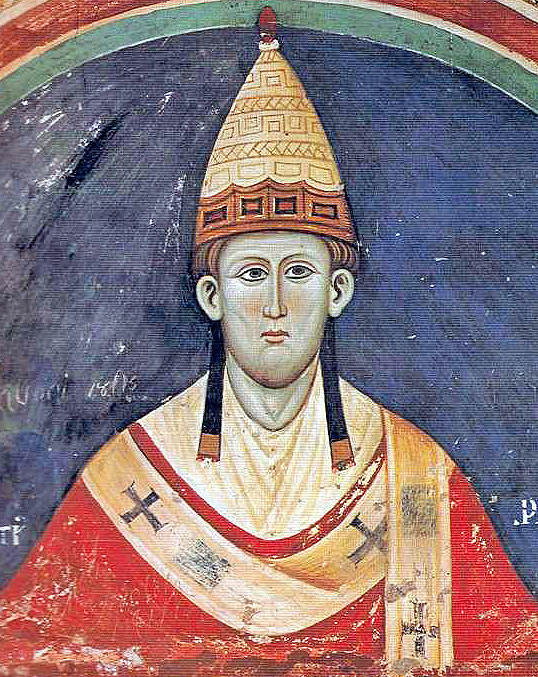
Pope Innocent III

The early edifice of the Hospital of Santo Spirito in Saxia was the Schola, erected by the King of Wessex Ine (689-726). At the beginning of the eight century the Schola had been conceived to host the Anglo-Saxon pilgrims visiting Rome, and in particular its innumerable holy places, like the tomb of Saint Peter. Bede wrote that "Nobles and plebeians, men and women, warriors and artisans came from Britannia". This pilgrimage lasted centuries; in that period Rome enjoyed such a fame that at least ten sovereigns are known to have come ad limina Apostolorum the first of them was Cædwalla, King of the Western Saxons (685-688). Following the foundation of the Schola, the whole quarter took an exotic character, so that it was known as the "town of Saxons"; even now the right bank of the Tiber is called Borgo (Italian for "village").

At the beginning of the pontificate of Leo IV, a violent fire - portrayed by Raphael in the fresco "The Fire in the Borgo" - devastated the quarter of the Saxons and also damaged the Scholae of the Frisians, the Lombards, the Franks and the Saxons themselves, coming to affect St. Peter's Basilica. Such an extended fire had to be malicious: it was probably set on by Saracens, penetrated up the river. Pope Leo IV looked after the reconstruction of the Church of Santa Maria in Saxia and of the Schola of the Saxons, in which many kings of Northern Europe, like Burgred of Mercia, or the Prince Alfred the Great, found rest after an exhausting journey.

A prosperous period followed; but, due to historical events such as the Norman invasion of England in 1066 and the beginning of the Crusades, which routed the crowds of pilgrims towards other destinations, the institution declined and just maintained its name. Innocent III was the Pope who brought it back to the top, modifying it and making it one of the most famous hospitals in the world. Furthermore, on November 25, 1198 he approved and recommended the Order of the Hospitallers, through the bull “Religiosam vitam”, by which he welcomed Guy de Montpellier and the institution he had founded under the protection of the Vatican.

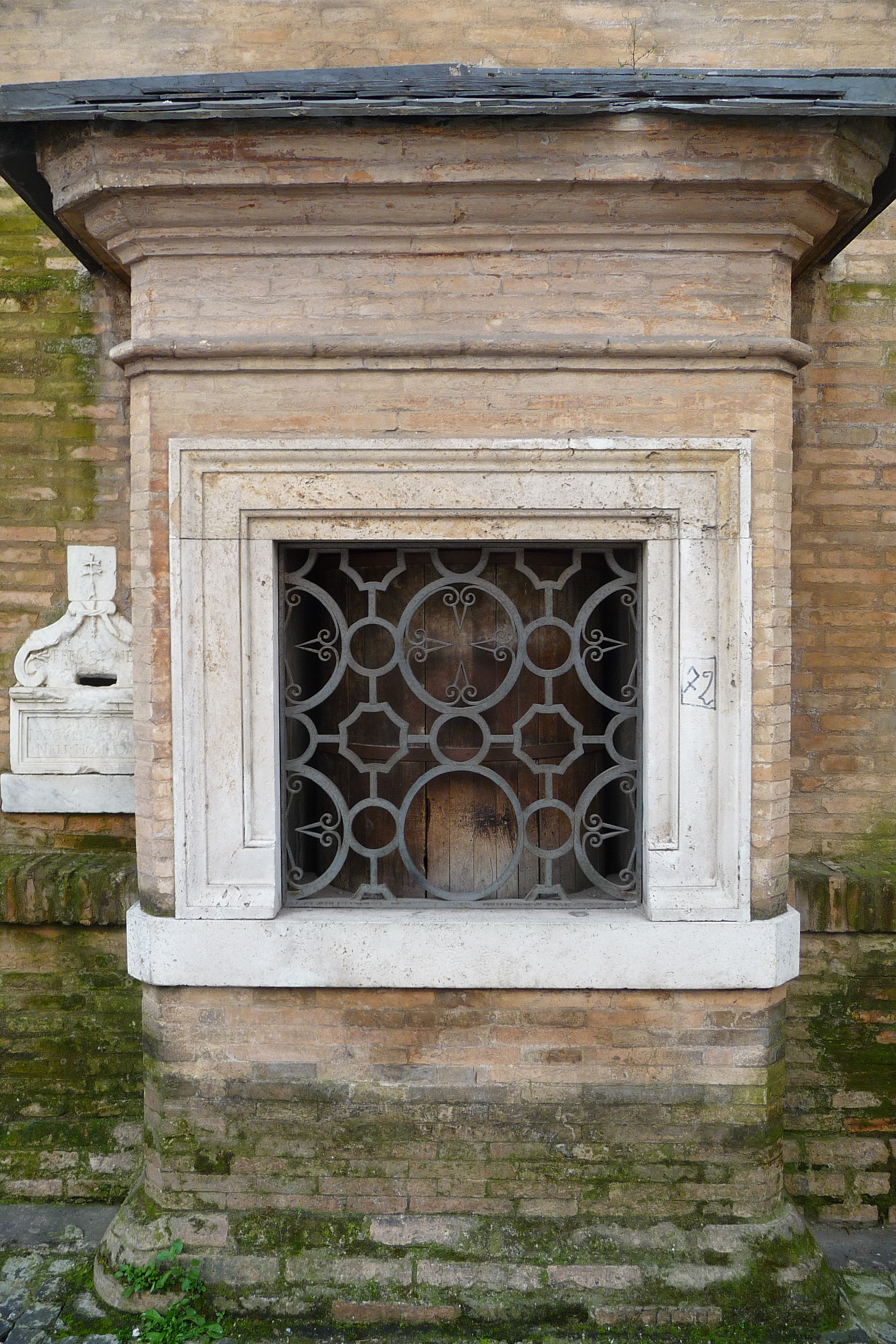
The baby hatch

In order to protect and uphold the orphan children, Innocent III dedicated them a new institution, the renowned ruota degli esposti ("baby hatch"), where the abandoned children were left.

Soon afterward Reginald, Bishop of Chartres, offered to the Hospital - at that time called Santa Maria in Saxia - a prebendary of his church. Thanks to the consecration of this new institution, Innocent III created a statute of rules for the Order of the Hospitallers, who was entrusted with the management and the safeguard of the Hospital, under the control of Guy de Montpellier.

In 1201 the same Pope endowed to the Hospital of Santa Maria the church with the same name and its incomes. This deed sanctioned the birth of the Venerable Roman Hospital of the Holy Spirit in Saxia, while the bordering church became a hospitality shelter. At the beginning of its existence, the new structure only consisted of a rectangular aisle enlightened by little windows, with a capacity of 300 patients and 600 indigents.

The Hospital received conspicuous donations, like the ones by the King of England John Lackland, who granted "the donation of the Church of Wirtel and of its incomes as an endowment to the Hospital", or the ones by the Pope himself, who erected new edifices alongside of the new institute and, starting from January 1208, granted to the new structure the privilege of "Sacred Station" on the Sunday following the eighth Epiphany, thus increasing the zeal of the faithful. The celebration was accompanied by a procession and a solemn ceremony, after which the Pope donated 3 dinars to the members of the Hospital and to 1000 poor men. It was a very important event, that gathered the people into the rising institute. The Pope pronounced a very significant homily, that began with the words taken from the Gospel of John: "On the third day a wedding took place at Cana in Galilee. Jesus’ mother was there, and Jesus and his disciples had also been invited to the wedding [...]".

The Roman Hospital was enlarged by many Popes and, century after century, it gained greatness and splendour, so that Pope Pius VI could proclaim it "The throne of Catholic Charity".

=== Guy de Montpellier ===
Guy de Montpellier is known as a knight templar, coming from the Montpellier family of the counts of Guillaume. He built in his native town a Hospital House, that rose in the area now called Pyla-Saint-Gely, and founded a regular order of Hospitallers Friars (1170), consecrated to give assistance to infirm, abandoned children and whoever needed help and cares. Documents dating back to the decade 1180-90 prove that the Hospital of Montpellier already had great importance, such as the new Hospitallers order. These documents show the existence of 6 Houses of the Holy Spirit all over France, following the model of Montpellier. By giving rise to the Holy Spirit organization, Guy wanted that ”the assistance and care were free from the cold-heartedness of a paid service, and raised up to the degree of a sacred duty, deserving to be compared to the pureness of the Apostles and early Christianity age”. The future Pope Innocent III, during his stay in France, had had the opportunity of admiring this effective institution and commented: "Here the hungry are fed, the poor are dressed, the orphan children are fed, the infirm are rendered the necessities and all kind of consolation is given to the poor. Therefore The Master and the Friars of the Holy Spirit should not be called hosts of the poor, but their servants, and they are the real poor men, as they charitably share the necessity to the indigent".

As soon as he ascended the papal throne, Innocent III publicly celebrated the institution of the Houses of the Holy Spirit: ”Through hard informations we know that the Hospital of the Holy Spirit, founded in Montpellier by our beloved son Friar Guy, shines over all the other hospitals in terms of Religion and practice of the greatest hospital charity, as all the ones that experienced it can testify”. Innocent III esteemed Guy insomuch as to appoint him commissioner against the heretics in France. With the 1198 bull he confirmed the foundation of the Hospitallers and placed them under his protection, together with all the French branches and the ones that were rising in Rome, such as Santa Maria in Trastevere and Sant’Agata on the Via Aurelia. The yearning of Guy was lucky enough to meet the thought of Innocent III. The Pope himself, in a letter to the bishops of France, proclaimed Guy as a “God-fearing man, dedicated to the good works”.

=== Arrival of Sixtus IV ===
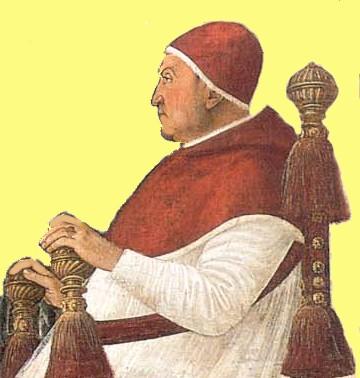
Pope Sixtus IV

In 1471 the Hospital suffered an imposing fire that led it to a crumbling condition. Sixtus IV (1471-1484), visiting the Hospital soon after his election, described it: “the falling walls, the narrow, gloomy edifices, without air and whichever comfort, look like a place intended for the captivity rather than health recovery”. He decided the immediate rebuilt, in view of the Jubilee of 1475. Thanks to Sixtus IV, the hospital enjoyed a real rebirth, thus becoming the most important place for scientific research: it hosted famous doctors, such as Giovanni Tiracorda, the personal doctor of Clement X, Lancisi and Baglivi, who conducted important medical projects. Furthermore, within the Antica Spezieria (Italian for "Ancient Spicery"), the use of quina bark was first experimented for the treatment of malaria.

In religious terms, the hospital could relish the presence of such personalities as St. Philip Neri and St. Camillus de Lellis. Finally, the importance of the Anatomical theatre can not be overlooked: it summoned such artists and scientists as Michelangelo, Leonardo da Vinci and Sandro Botticelli, who reproduced the façade of the hospital in the background of the fresco “Jesus cleansing a leper”.

=== Former Rule of Santo Spirito ===
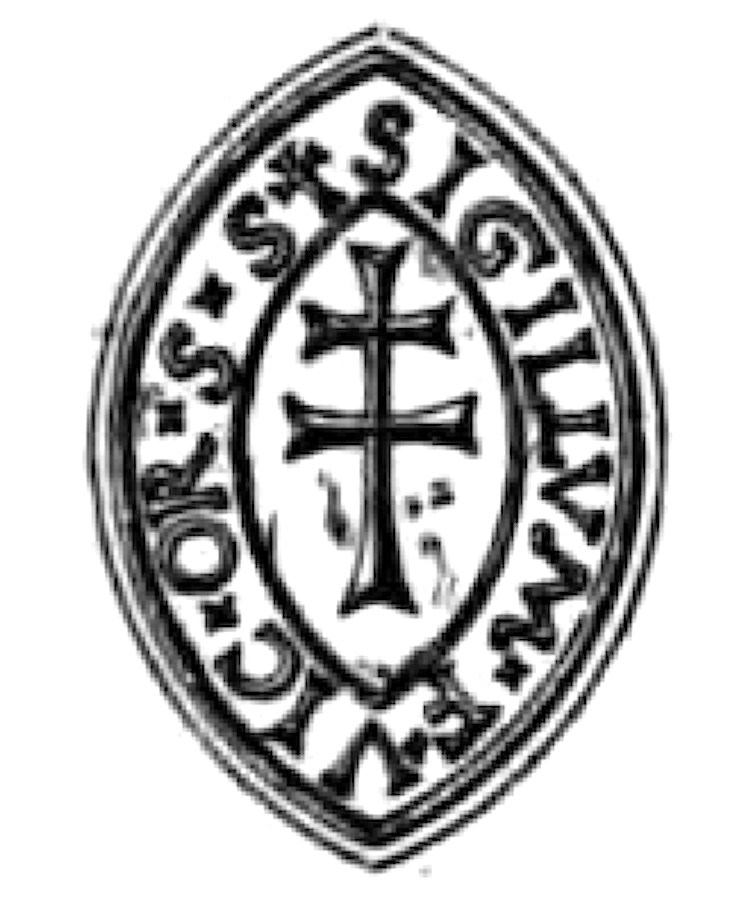
The "Cross of Lorraine", the coat of arms of the Santo Spirito

The Hospitaller Order is based on its Rule, consisting of 105 short chapters, many of which extensively recall the duties of former religious orders. Two examples of the Rule of Santo Spirito have been conserved: one is in the National Archive of Rome, the other in the archive of the hospital of Dijon, both dating back to the fifteenth century. This Rule is effectively appropriate to the hospital framework, pervaded with discipline and unselfishness, and thoroughly clarifies the progression of the everyday life in the hospital. It is especially noticeable that most of the chapters have the purpose to make the stay of the ill in the structure more comfortable and healthy. For instance, Chapter 1 says that all goods belong to everybody and that "Nobody shall dare saying that a thing is his own", while Chapter 15 says "The spirit of charity shall be a constant rule" and Chapter 33 contains scrupulous rules about clothing provision and orphans breeding.

=== Hospitals of Santo Spirito between 12th and 13th centuries ===
At the end of the 12th century, two hospitals of the Order of Santo Spirito worked in Rome: the first one was the subject of this item, while the second one rose close to the Church of Sant’Agata, at the door of the town; another hospital of the same Order rose in the same century close to the church of San Biagio in Orte. At the end of the 13th century the Hospitals of Santo Spirito amounted about to a hundred, the majority of which in Lazio, but also in Umbria, Abruzzo, Marche, Tuscany and Kingdom of Naples. The most famous and important ones, besides the mother house in Rome, were the ones in Florence, Milan, Foligno, Pozzuoli and Viterbo.

=== Modern period ===
In 1605, to ensure a more organized management of the Hospital's properties and its continued finances, Pope Paul V supported the institution of the Banco di Santa Spirito. In the seventeenth century it had its seat in the banking quarter near the head of the Ponte Sant'Angelo.

Santo Spirito had become the flagship charitable organization and principal hospital of Rome. At the end of the eighteenth century the Hospital retained a considerable property of more than 37,070 acres (15,000 hectares). It comprised numerous estates, of which the chief ones were Santa Severa, Palidoro, and Castel di Guido. In 1896 the formerly separate administrations of the other Roman hospitals were unified with that of Santo Spirito under the corporate name "Pio Istituto di Santo Spirito ed Ospedali riuniti di Roma," forming the largest hospital complex in Europe. Dissolved in 1976, its entire endowment was transferred to the Comune di Roma in 1981.

=== Present day ===
Since 2000 the monumental complex has become one of the congress centres of Rome and is managed by Giubilarte s.r.l. It houses conventions, gala dinners, fashion shows and art exhibitions.

The complex of Santo Spirito in Sassia belongs to the association "Historic Conference Centres of Europe" and is a supporting member of the Healthcare Convention and Exhibitors Association.

== Complex ==
=== Corsia Sistina ===
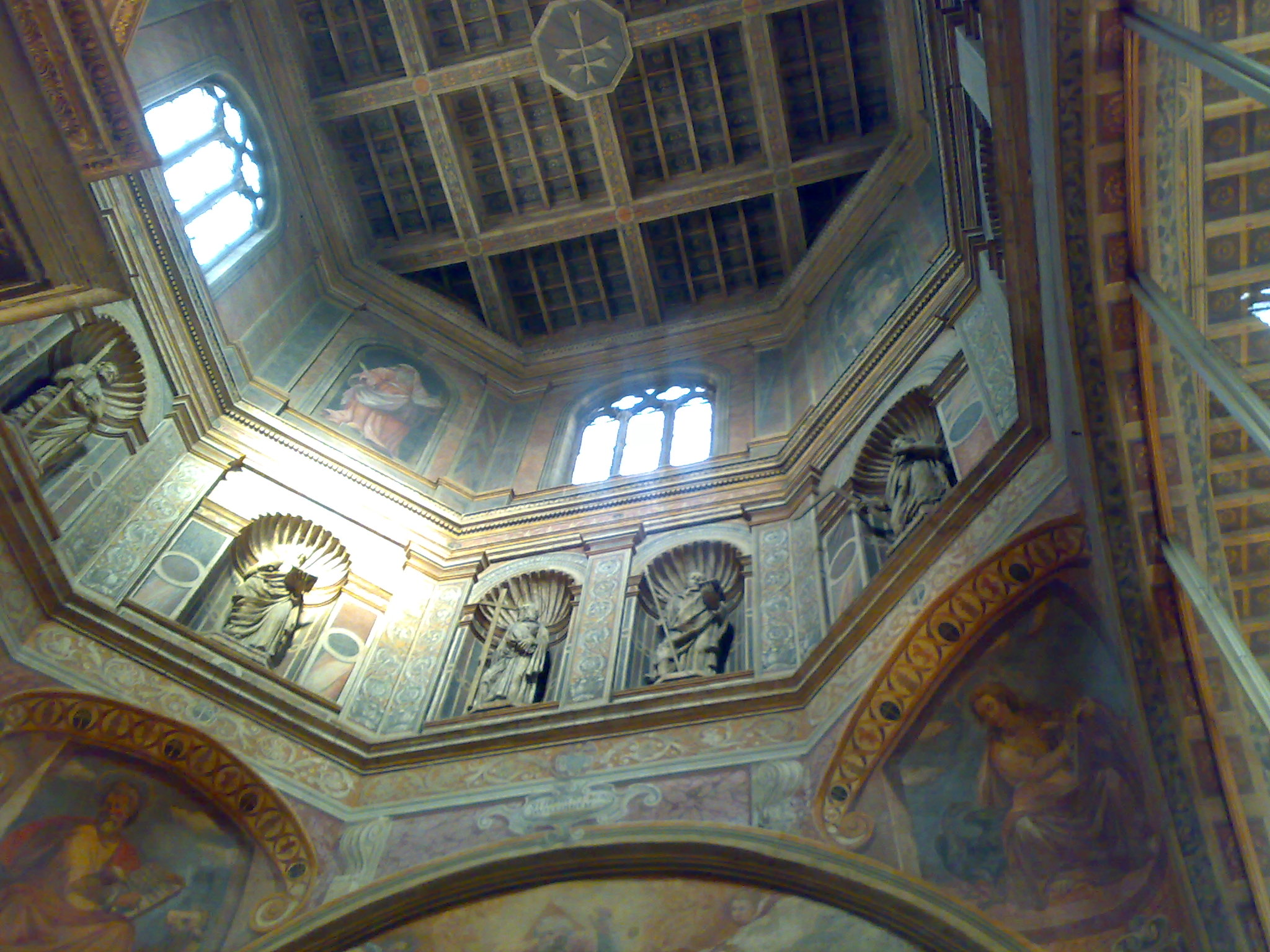
Corsia Sistina, the octagonal tower

The Corsia Sistina (Italian for "Sixtine Aisle"), erected for the will of Sixtus IV after grieves, sacks and fires, is the main building of the hospital. Surmounted by an octagonal tower, the Corsia is an immense hall, 340 ft long and 40 ft wide, divided into two sections separated by a lantern: the two rooms were called "Lower Wing" and "Upper Wing". The lantern, that puts the rooms into contact, has two levels: on the outer side it shows two- and three-mullioned windows, ascribed to the architect Giovanni Pietro Ghirlanducci from Parma, while the internal side is decorated with shell-shaped niches, housing statues of the Apostles, and barrel-vaulted intradosses with coffers, arguably due to the florentine architect and ébéniste Giovannino de' Dolci. In the middle of the lantern rises an altar, probably the only Roman work by Andrea Palladio; behind the altar formerly there was a pipe organ, whose music gladdened the ill during their stay. In the prostyle of the lantern there is one of the two main entrances of the ancient Sixtine hospital; it has a double gate: the inner one, called "Gate of Paradise", is ascribed to Andrea Bregno. Close to the gate of Bregno there is the ruota degli esposti (baby hatch), created by Innocent III for the reception of the orphans. The other entrance of the hospital, portrayed by Sandro Botticelli into a fresco of the Sistine Chapel, is preceded by a large portico with octagonal pillars.

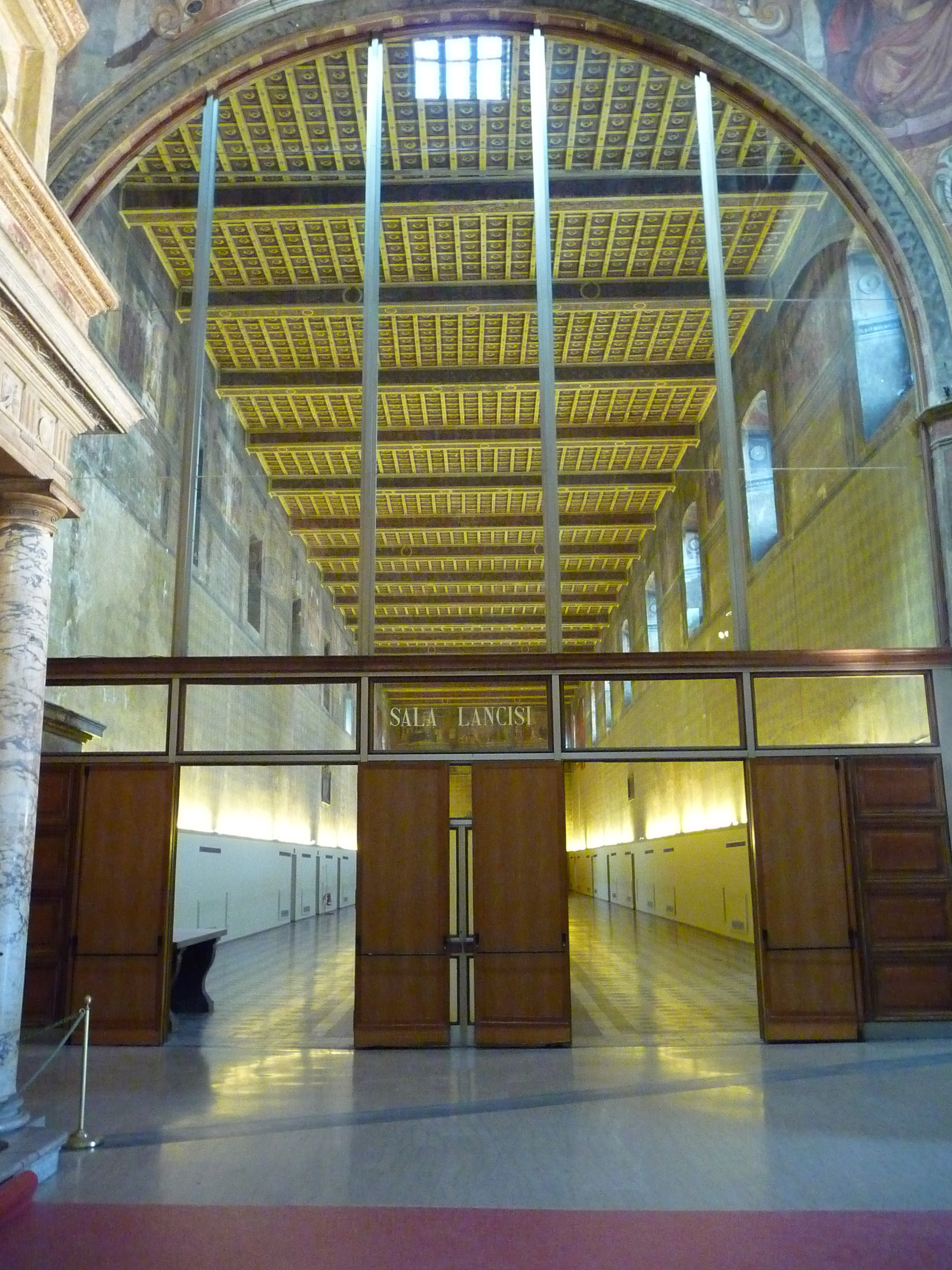
Corsia Sistina, south wing

In 1478, the walls of the Corsia were frescoed with a frieze made by more than fifty scenes, depicting the origins of the hospital of Innocent III and the most important episodes of the life of Sixtus IV. The fresco was painted by artists of the so-called "Umbro-Roman School", such as Melozzo da Forlì, Domenico Ghirlandaio, Pinturicchio and Antoniazzo Romano. The cycle of the frescoes, depicting the origin of the hospital and a few episodes about Innocent III, starts from the east wall and continues till the south wall; here starts the depiction of the life and deeds of Sixtus IV. The most important episodes include the killing of the kids thrown into the Tiber, the dream of Innocent III and the fishermen showing kids corpses to Innocent III. The dream described in the fresco was the one that persuaded Innocent III to found the Schola of the Saxons, the former seat of the Hospital.

The complex of the Ospedale di Santo Spirito lies over an area that, in ancient Rome, was occupied by the villa of Agrippina the Elder (wife of Germanicus and mother of Caligula): in some rooms below the Corsia Sistina, remains of opus reticulatum walls, mosaic floors, carved marbles and frescoes are still visible.

=== Cloisters of the Friars and of the Nuns ===
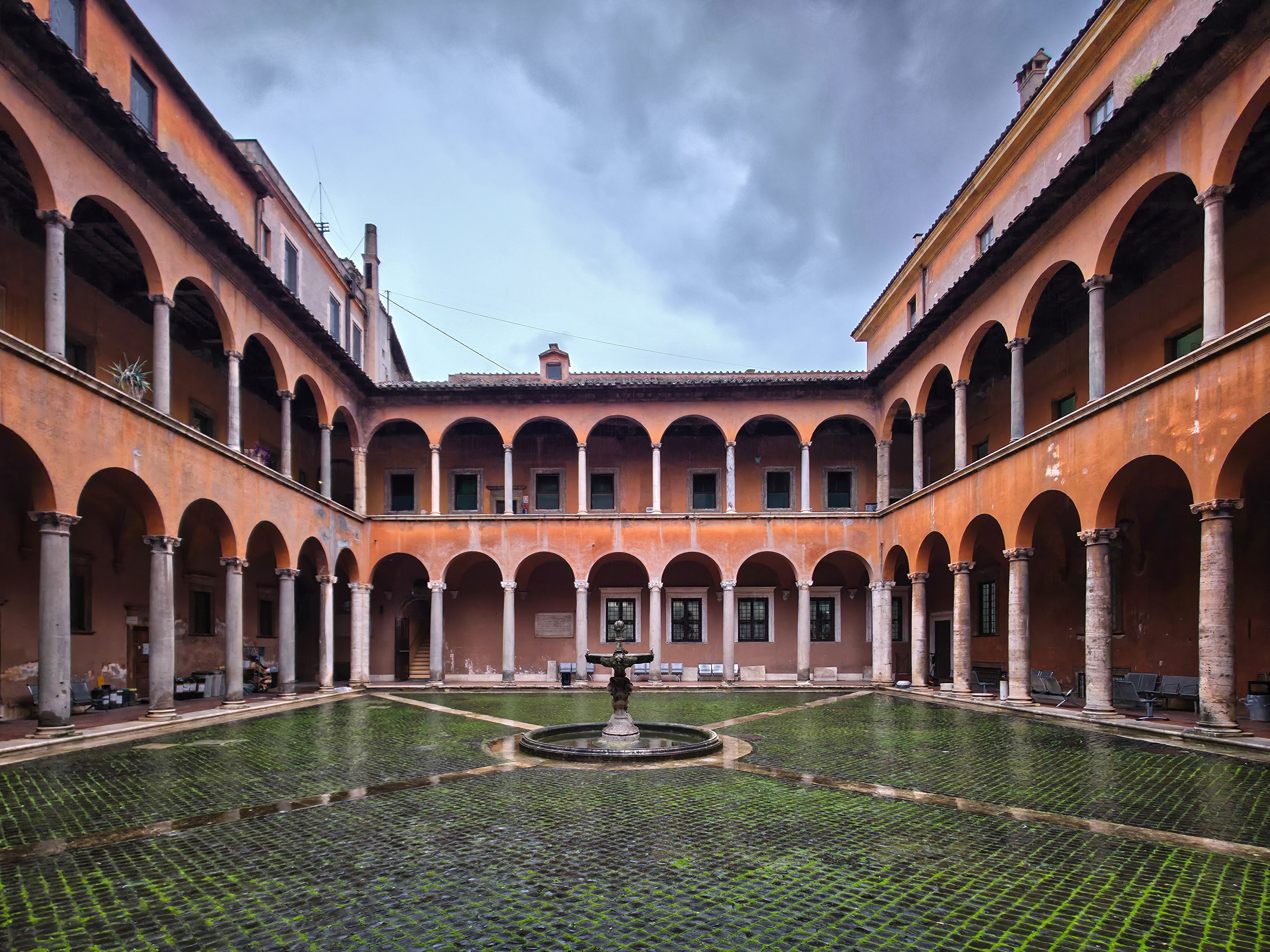
Cloister

After building the "Lower Wing" of the Corsia Sistina, Pope Sixtus IV erected two religious edifices at the service of the foundation, one for the friars and the other for the nuns. Both edifices overlook a rectangular cloister, bordered by a double loggia with arches resting on ionic columns; the refectory and the kitchen were in common. The two cloisters, though very similar at all appearances, nevertheless show subtle but substantial differences: the Cloister of the Nuns has an additional arch and shows the coat of arms of Sixtus IV on the transom of the doors and windows; the same coat of arms is also visible in the middle of the groin vaults in the corners. Furthermore, in 1479 some rooms within the edifice of the nuns were used as an hospice for the nobles and later for the nurses taking care of the abandoned children. In 1791 twelve columns of the Cloister of the Friars and ten columns of the Cloister of the Nuns were removed by the nephews of Pius VI, who re-employed them in the Honour Grand Staircase of Palazzo Braschi.

In the middle of both cloisters a fountain rises: the most important is the one in the Cloister of the Nuns, called "Fountain of the Dolphins", an example of refined 16th-century elegance, attributable to Baccio Pontelli.

In addition to the Cloisters of the Friars and of the Nuns, the hospital has a third cloister, located within the porticoes of the "Ancient Conservatory". This cloister is surrounded by a garden with a simple but elegant well in the middle.

=== Palazzo del Commendatore ===
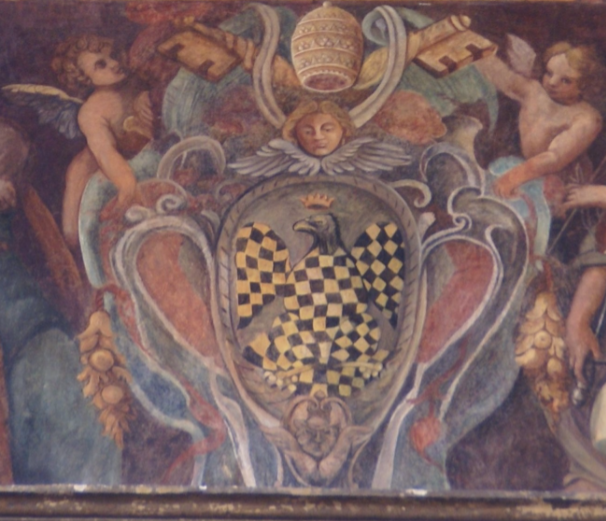
Coat of arms of Pope Innocent III, in the "Palazzo del Commendatore"

Palazzo del Commendatore (Italian for "Palace of the Knight Commander"), a 16th-century enlargement of the complex, was erected under the pontificate of Pius V and dedicated to Monsignor Bernardino Cirillo, Commendatore from 1556 to 1575, regarded as one of the most famous Commendatori of the institute. The palace overlooks a quadrangular courtyard bordered by a double loggia with arches resting on doric columns in the lower loggia and on ionic columns in the upper one. The ceiling of the lower portico is a ribbed vault, that of the upper portico is wooden; the area of the courtyard houses an impluvium, on the model of the houses in ancient Rome. The central arch of the lower loggia hosts a fountain erected by Paul V as a decoration for the Palace of the Vatican and later moved to the Palazzo del Commendatore by Alexander VII. The upper loggia, in correspondence to the fountain, shows a big clock surrounded by the coat of arms of the family of Cardinal Ludovico Gazzoli. The face of the clock is framed by the figure of a snake touching its own tail, symbol of eternity; on both sides there is a cross with two horizontal axes, symbol of the Holy Spirit.

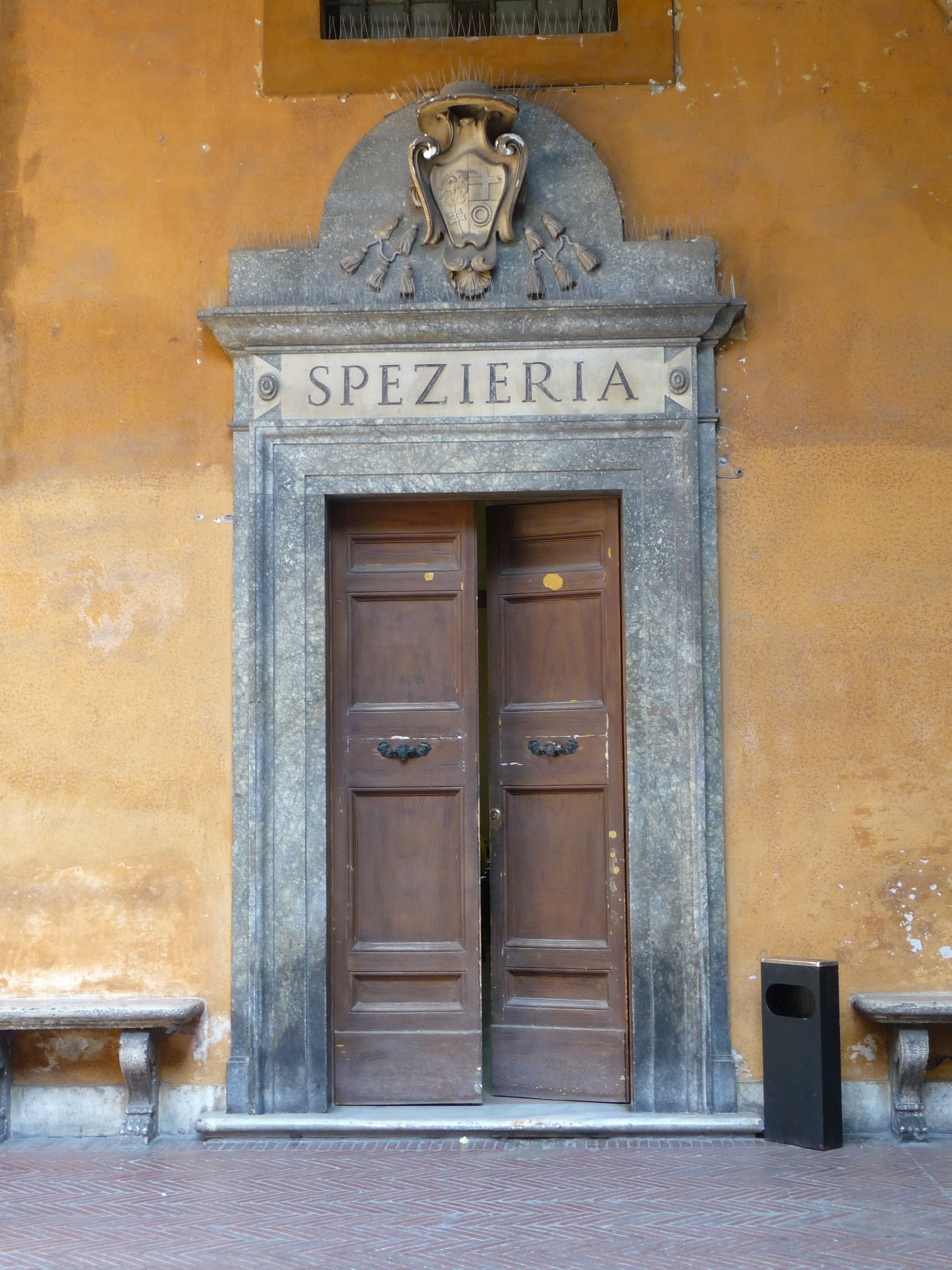
The entrance of the Spezieria

On the left of the main entrance of the courtyard there is the door of the ancient Spezieria (spicery) of the Hospital, lately restored and still containing its wonderful and a rich collection of fine pictures.

On the right of the main entrance are the Accademia Lancisiana and the grand staircase, giving access to the first floor of the Palazzo and to the upper loggia, which shows a plaster impression of a low-relief by Antonio Canova depicting a lesson of anatomy. The walls of the upper loggia are entirely decorated with frescoes commissioned by Cardinal Teseo Aldrovandi to the painter Ercole Pelillo from Salerno; they show landscapes, panoplies and grotesques.

The loggia gives access, through a double doorway, to the Apartment of the Commendatore, consisting of many rooms decorated with magnificent tapestries, ancient furniture and sculptures, among which a Virgin with the Child by Andrea del Verrocchio. The most eminent room is the Gala Hall, called Salone del Commendatore; this room was interely frescoed by the brothers Jacopo and Francesco Zucchi, who portrayed the history of the Hospital, from the dream of Pope Innocent III, to Pope Sixtus IV visiting the building sites, up to the whole, diversified endeavour carried out by the Institution (see the paragraph Corsia Sistina). Each scene simulates a tapestry bordered by draperies, on which the coats of arms of Santo Spirito, with its typical "Cross of Lorraine", and of the Aldrovandi family are alternately represented. Finally, the corners of the room are decorated with pictures of festoons and fruits.

=== Biblioteca Lancisiana ===
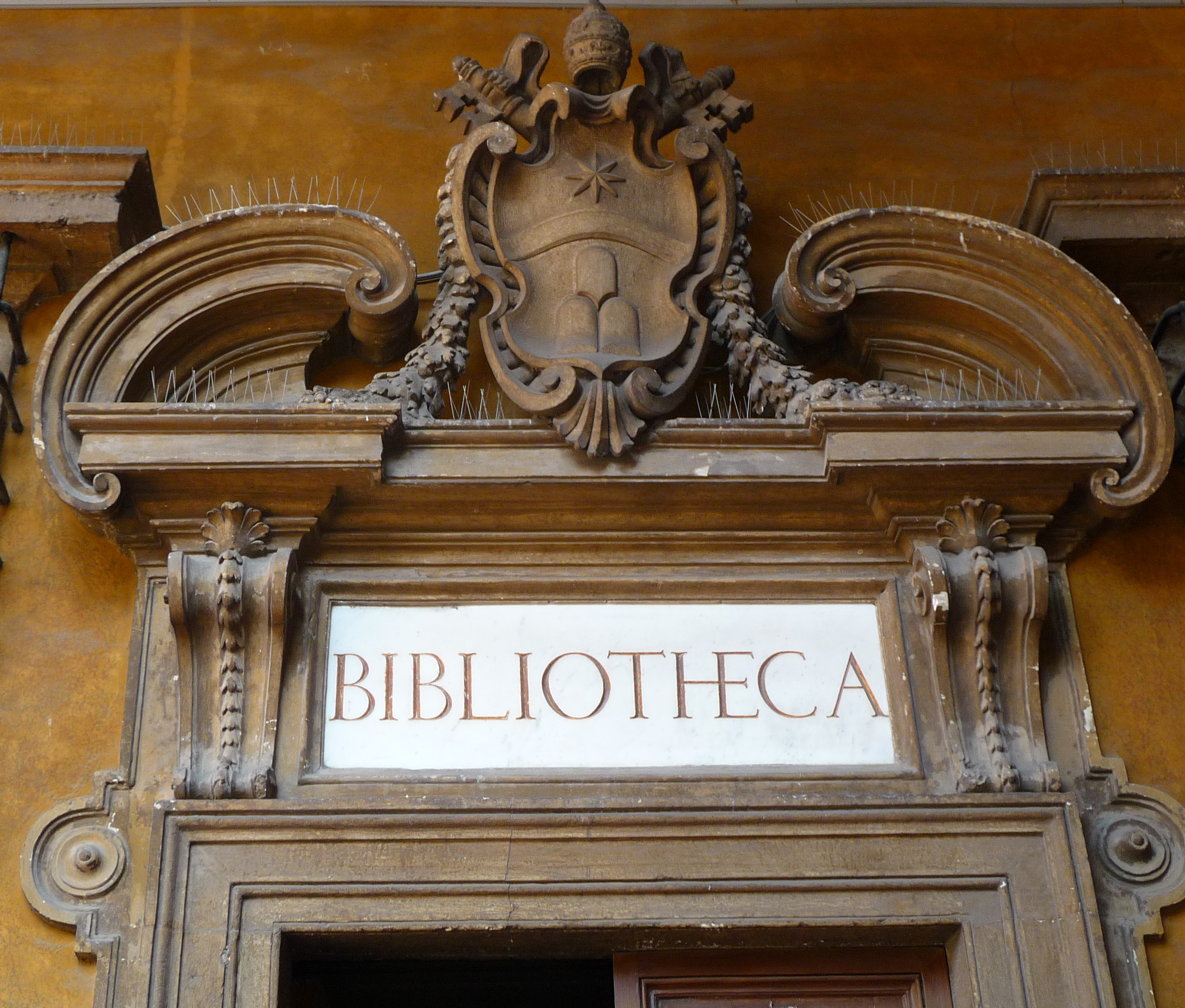
Biblioteca Lancisiana, entrance

The Room of the Commendatore, as well as the upper loggia, give access to the Biblioteca Lancisiana, founded in 1711 by Giovanni Maria Lancisi, an eminent scholar and the doctor of Pope Innocent XI, who made this library the heart of his project for the promotion of scientific culture. The library was inaugurated in 1714 in the presence of Pope Clement XI. It is composed of two large halls: the first one has an atrium and a vestibule; the second one, the former part of the library, has 16 wooden shelves. The collections of books comprise the Lancisi collection, made with books donated by the King of France Louis XIV, the Grand Duke of Tuscany Cosimo III, and Prince Fürstenberg. The library also conserves 373 valued manuscripts from 14th to 20th century, among which two parchment codices with Latin translations of texts by Avicenna and the well-known Liber Fraternitatis Sancti Spiritus. A little window, located behind one of the walls of the library, opens up at the level of the frescoes of the Corsia Sistina: it allowed the various Commendatori who managed the Institute to check up on the staff responsible for the care of the sick. In the middle of the main hall of the library there are two magnificent globes made in 1600.

== Church ==
The complex includes the Church of Santo Spirito in Sassia.

== Bibliography ==
- Alloisi, Sivigliano; Alloisi, Luisa Cardilli (2002). Santo Spirito in Saxia (in Italian). Roma: Istituto nazionale di studi romani.
- Amoroso, Maria Lucia (1998). Il complesso monumentale di Santo Spirito in Saxia - Corsia Sistina e Palazzo del Commendatore, Newton & Compton editori, Rome 1998.
- Cappelletti, V.; and Tagliarini, F., eds (200). L'antico Ospedale di Santo Spirito dall'istituzione papale alla sanità del terzo millennio (Rome, 2001–2002), 2 vols.
- Curcio, Giovanna (1998), "L'ampliamento dell'ospedale di Santo Spirito in Sassia nel quadro della politica di Benedetto XIV per la città di Roma," in: D. B. Maiano (ed.), Benedetto XIV e le arti del disegno, (Rome: Quasar 1998), pp. 177–232.
- De Angelis, Pietro (1960). L'ospedale di Santo Spirito in Saxia (in Italian). Vol. I: Dalle origini al 1300. Rome: Biblioteca della Lancisiana.
- Howe, Eunice D. (1978). The Hospital of Santo Spirito and Pope Sixtus IV. Garland Pub.
- Keyvanian, Carla (2015). "Chapter 6". Hospitals and Urbanism in Rome, 1200-1500. Boston-Leiden: Brill. pp. 339–383. ISBN 978-90-04-30755-1.

Preceded by Torre dei Conti	Landmarks of Rome; Ospedale di Santo Spirito in Sassia	Succeeded by Torre delle Milizie
