= Castel Sant'Elia =

- Comune
- Comune di Castel Sant'Elia
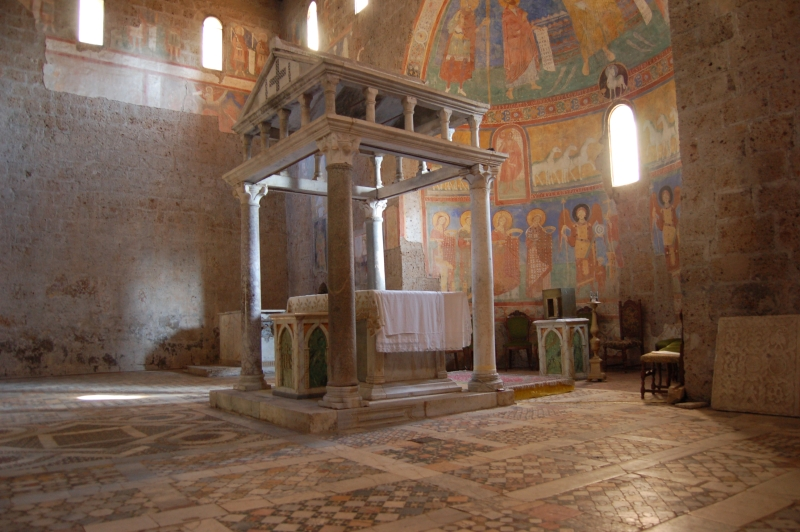
- Ciborium in the Basilica of Sant'Elia.

- Coat of arms

- Location within Italy Location within Lazio
- Coordinates: 42°15′N 12°22′E
- Country: Italy
- Region: Lazio
- Province: Viterbo (VT)

Government
  - Mayor: Vincenzo Girolami

Area
  - Total: 23.92 km^{2} (9.24 sq mi)
- Elevation: 210 m (690 ft)

Population (30 June 2017)
  - Total: 2,629
  - Density: 109.9/km^{2} (284.7/sq mi)
- Demonym: Castellesi
- Time zone: UTC+1 (CET)
  - Summer (DST): UTC+2 (CEST)
- Postal code: 01030
- Dialing code: 0761
- Patron saint: St. Anastasius and St. Nonnosus
- Saint day: 03 September
- Website: Official website

Castel Sant'Elia (locally Castello) is a comune (municipality) in the Province of Viterbo, Latium, central Italy, located about 40 kilometres (25 mi) north of Rome and about 30 kilometres (19 mi) southeast of Viterbo.

== Main sights ==
Castel Sant'Elia's main attraction is the Basilica of Sant'Elia or Sant'Anastasio, a medieval church built, according to tradition, over an ancient temple of Diana. It dates to the 1120s and is built in tuff with three portals, all sculpted with flowers, animals and monstrous figures. The interior comprises a nave and two aisles, divided by re-used ancient columns. Under the apse is the crypt, housing the tombs of St. Anastasius and St. Nonnosus.

Nearby is the Sanctuary of Santa Maria ad Rupes, housing a tunnel with 144 steps carved by hand by a local hermit, an endeavor that took 14 years.
