= San Michele Arcangelo ai Corridori di Borgo =

Church building in Rome, Italy, demolished in 1939

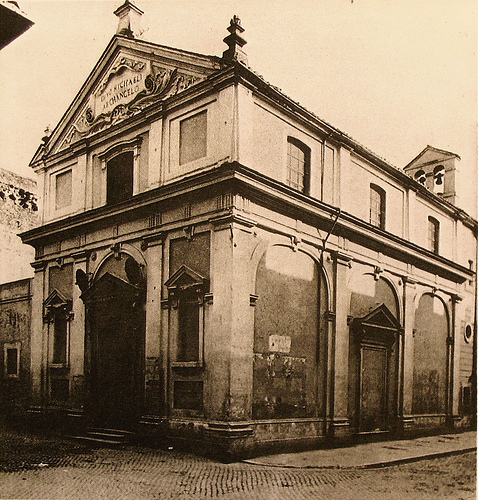
- View of the church of San Michele Arcangelo with the passetto in background (1900 ca.)
- Click on the map for a fullscreen view
- 41°54′11.99″N 12°27′47.8″E
- Location: Borgo, Rome
- Country: Italy
- Denomination: Roman Catholic

History
- Dedication: St. Michael, the Archangel

Architecture
- Functional status: Destroyed in 1939
- Architect: Tiberio Calcagni
- Groundbreaking: Middle Ages

San Michele Arcangelo ai Corridori di Borgo was a church in Rome dedicated to St. Michael, the Archangel, important for historical and artistic reasons.

The church, traditionally linked to the legend of the appearance of St. Michael above Castel Sant'Angelo and seat of the confraternity of the same name, was founded in the Middle Ages and rebuilt in 1564. The 16th century church, a small hall building, was the work of the Florentine mannerist architect Tiberio Calcagni, and had a side chapel on the left side of the first bay. The building was decorated with frescoes and paintings from the mannerist period, and housed a fresco from the 15th century, the Nursing Madonna, attributed to Antoniazzo Romano, accidentally found in 1825 in the courtyard wall.

The church was demolished in 1939 to allow for the enlargement of two roads: Borgo Sant'Angelo and Via della Traspontina, as part of a project to open Via della Conciliazione. After its demolition in 1939 the most important works of art were transferred to the reconstructed oratory of the Nunziatina on the Lungotevere Vaticano.

== Location ==
The church was located in Borgo, a rione of Rome which until 1929 comprised also Vatican City, at the southern end of Via di Porta Castello. It abutted the Passetto di Borgo, the covered passage that connects the Vatican Palace to Castel Sant'Angelo. Its south side overlooked the Borgo Sant'Angelo road.

== Denomination ==
The building, originally dedicated to all of the angels, was later dedicated to St. Michael, the Archangel (Italian: San Michele), who according to legend appeared atop the nearby Castel Sant'Angelo to stop a plague. The church was also called Sant'Angelo di Borgo and San Michelino ("little St. Michael"). Beginning in the time of Pope Alexander VI (r. 1492–1503), it was also called Sant'Angelo al corridoio, where the modifier al corridoio ("by the corridor") described its proximity to the Passetto di Borgo, called er corridore in the Romanesco dialect.

== History ==
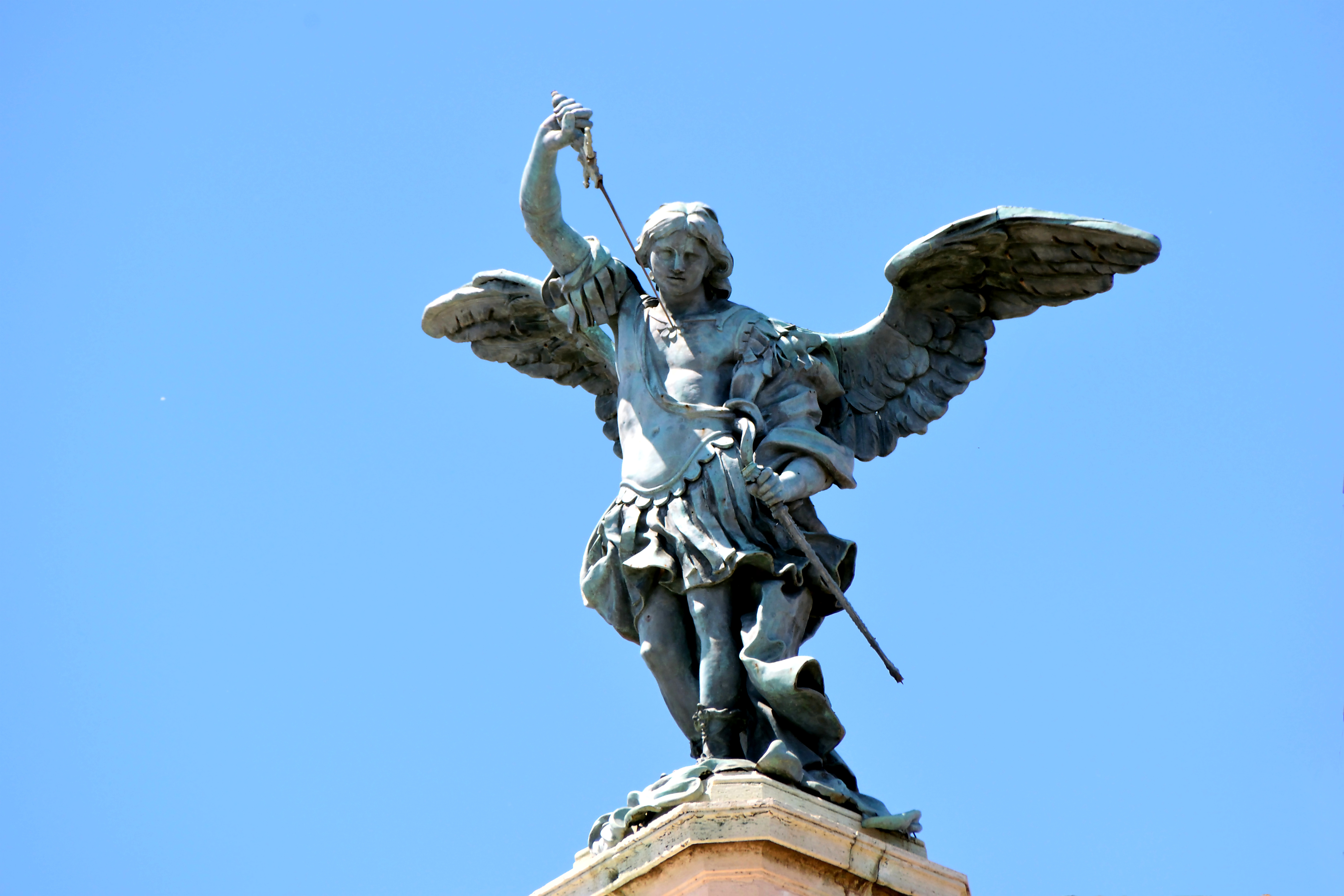
Statue of St. Michael, the Archangel on the top of Castel Sant'Angelo: the origin of the church is traditionally linked to the legend of the apparition of the archangel above the castle to stop a plague.

Tradition links the origin of a church bearing this name to the legend of the appearance of St. Michael above Castel Sant'Angelo. According to the legend, Saint Michael sheathed his sword, stopping a plague, after a procession to implore God's help led by Pope Gregory I (r. 590–604) had reached the castle.

Although such an ancient foundation date for a church on this site seems unlikely, it is possible that in the Middle Ages there was another church in the neighborhood called Sant'Angelo di Castello. Lying much nearer to Castel Sant'Angelo than the modern church building, it would have had to be demolished because of its vicinity to the fortress. The existence of the church is first recorded during the pontificate of Pope Eugene IV (r. 1431–1447). A hospital was attached to it, called hospitale angelorum ("Angels' hospital") or hospitale sancti Angeli ("Holy Angels' hospital"), administered by the Confraternita di San Michele Arcangelo, established in 1432. While the brotherhood is active to this day, the hospital closed at the end of the 15th century. The confraternity, whose main task changed over time from the care of the sick to the provision of a dowry for Borgo's poor unmarried girls (zitelle in the Romanesco dialect), financed itself by renting several properties in the rione of Borgo and elsewhere in the city. The brethren gathered in an oratory along Borgo Sant'Angelo attached to the church; the oratory's façade was renewed in 1717 by Camillo Paladini.

The church and hospital were demolished in 1497, under Pope Alexander VI, and the former was rebuilt in 1564 according to a design by the Florentine architect Tiberio Calcagni. The reconstructed church was assigned again to the Confraternita di San Michele Arcangelo by Pope Pius IV (r. 1559–1565).

The building, restored in 1867, was set to be demolished according to Rome's 1908 town-planning scheme, which envisioned the construction of a wide avenue connecting Ponte Vittorio Emanuele II (and thus the center of Rome) with the Prati rione. This avenue would have been created by widening Via di Porta Castello, the road in front of the church, which would have meant the demolition of the building. Spared for thirty years because of the suspension of the project and the opposition of municipal technical commissions, the church was demolished in July 1939 to make way for the enlargement of two roads, Borgo Sant'Angelo and Via della Traspontina, as part of a project to open Via della Conciliazione.

After the demolition of its seat, in 1969 the archconfraternity was merged with that of Santa Maria Annunziata in Borgo. Since then, it has been officiating in the rebuilt oratory of the Annunziata ("la Nunziatina") on the Lungotevere Vaticano.

== Description ==
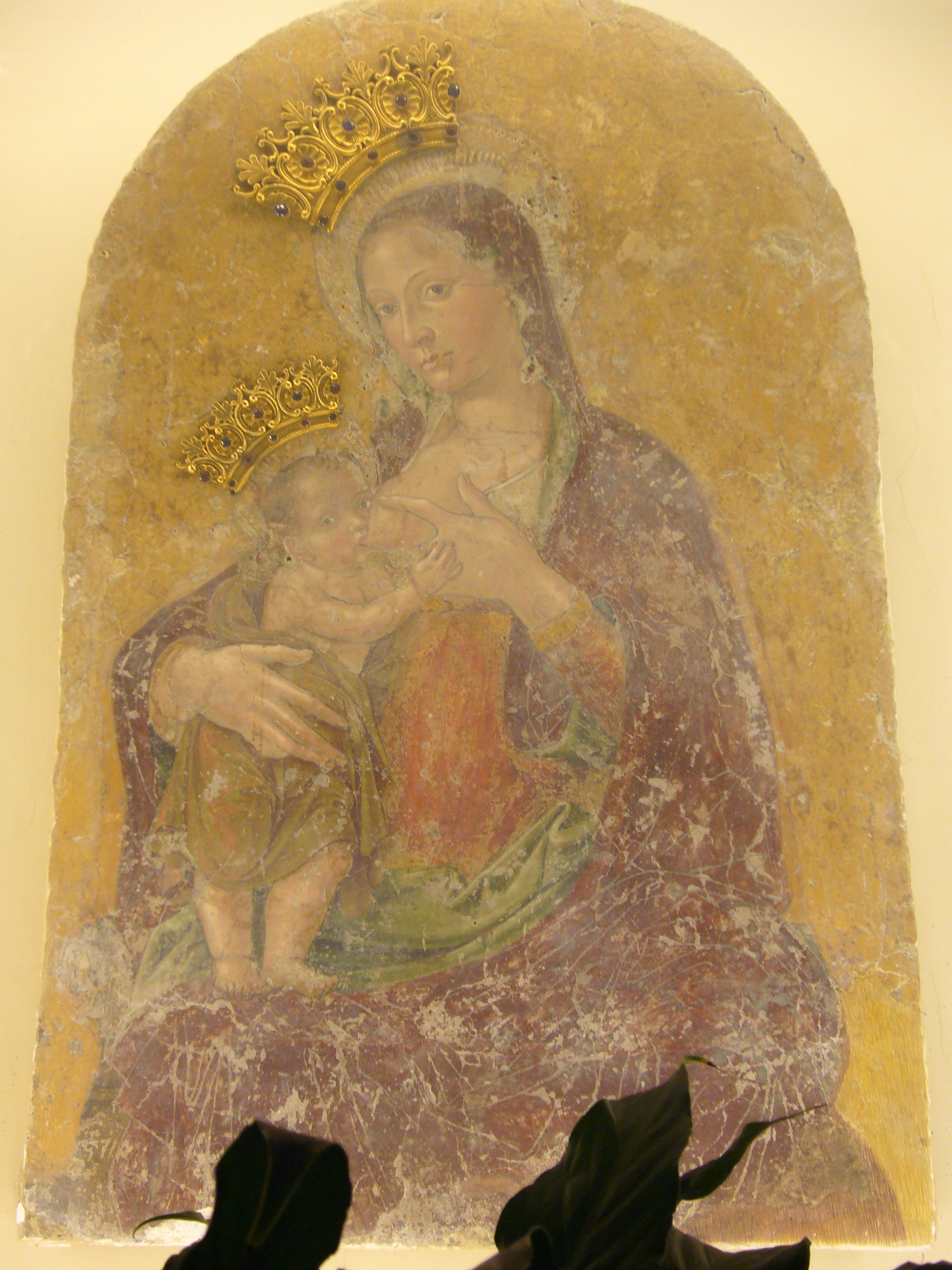
Nursing Madonna, a fresco attributed to Antoniazzo Romano, was once in the church and now in the Nunziatina oratory.

=== Architecture ===
The facade of the church had one order surmounted by an attic. The lower part had a portal flanked by two niches and was marked by pilasters, while the attic was divided by frames separated by tapered pilasters. The facade was crowned with a tympanum, surmounted by two oriflammes (flaming stone standards), which framed a cartouche bearing the Latin dedication inscription: "DIVO MICHAELI ARCHANGELO" (English: To Saint Michael, the Archangel). On the roof between the church and the oratory stood a bell-gable.

=== Interior ===
The church had a single nave with only one chapel, dedicated to the Virgin, on the left side of the first bay. The shrine had three altars: above the center one, there was a painting of St. Michael by Giovanni de Vecchi. The altar on the right was dedicated to the crucifixion of Jesus, depicting Jesus on the cross. Above the left altar, a work by Giuseppe Valadier, were works celebrating the Virgin Mary, including frescoes by Giovanni Battista della Marca, a late Mannerist painter. His Procession of Saint Gregory the Great was commissioned by the confraternity with the aim of reinforcing the legend of St. Michael and the plague.

The church housed several works of art, including a painting by della Marca depicting the apparition of Michael the Archangel atop the castle, and a bronze statue of the archangel by the French sculptor Louis-Albert Lefeuvre, donated by Pope Leo XIII (r. 1878–1903). On the ceiling, there was a late-17th-century fresco of the archangel subduing the devil.

The sacristy housed one of the most interesting documents of the early Roman Middle Ages: the pavonazzetto marble tombstone placed by the notary Eugenius in memory of his son Boetius, who died aged 11 on 25 October 577, and of his wife Argenta, who died seven months later. The stele, perhaps originally in the quadriporticus of the Old St. Peter's Basilica, was moved to the sacristy during the 16th century.

In the courtyard of the church, in a niche of the passetto, a fresco by 15th-century painter Antoniazzo Romano depicting the Madonna del latte col Bambino ("Nursing Madonna") was discovered by accident in 1825. The Madonna, which was later crowned under the name of Refugium Peccatorum ("shelter of the sinners"), was detached from the wall and exhibited for veneration by the faithful above the left altar of the church.

In 1867, the lunettes of the church were frescoed by Attilio Palombi with scenes from the life of the confraternity. On the same occasion, the renovation of the marble floor caused the dispersion of several medieval tombstones.

Due to the merging of the archconfraternity with that of Santa Maria Annunziata, after the demolition of the church almost all of the furnishings and works of art contained there, including the Nursing Madonna and the fresco by della Marca, were moved to the nearby Nunziatina oratory. Some architectural elements of the building, dismantled during the demolition, are preserved in municipal storerooms.

== Sources ==
- Borgatti, Mariano (1926). Borgo e S. Pietro nel 1300–1600–1925 (in Italian). Roma: Federico Pustet.
- Giacomini, Federica (2016). Claudio Parisi Presicce; Laura Petacco (eds.). San Michele Arcangelo ai Corridori di Borgo (in Italian). Roma: Gangemi. ISBN 978-88-492-3320-9.
- Gigli, Laura (1990). Guide rionali di Roma (in Italian). Vol. Borgo (I). Fratelli Palombi Editori, Roma. ISSN 0393-2710.
