= Palazzo Alicorni =

Coordinates: 41°54′6.10″N 12°27′42.50″E

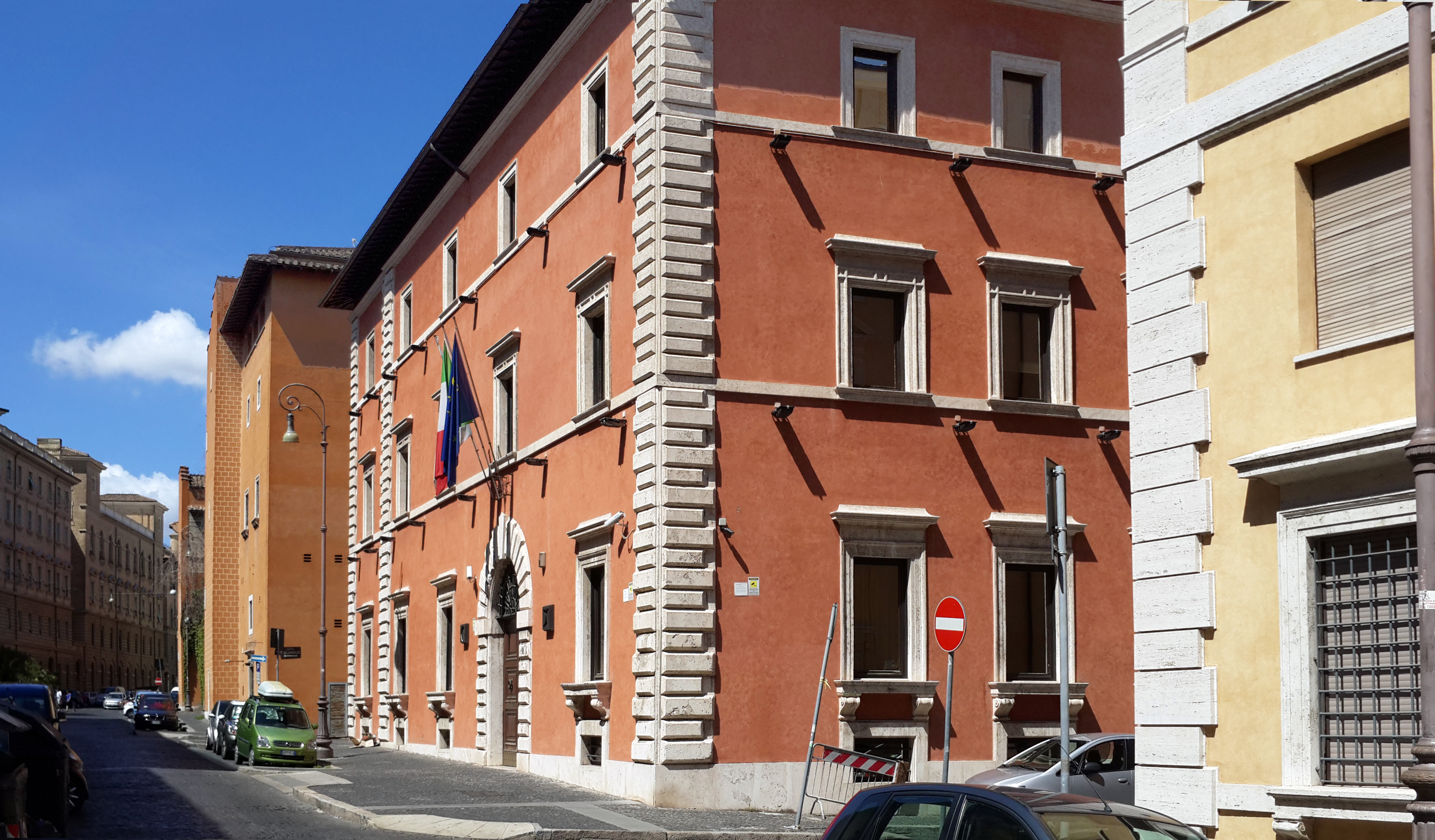
- The palace seen from the eastern side of Borgo Santo Spirito

General information
- Architectural style: Renaissance
- Location: Rome, Italy

Palazzo Alicorni is a reconstructed Renaissance building in Rome, important for historical and architectural reasons. The palace, originally lying only a few meters away from Bernini's Colonnades in St. Peter's square, was demolished in 1931 in the wake of the process of the border definition of the newly established Vatican City state, and rebuilt some hundred meters to the east. According to the stylistic analysis, his designer had been identified as Giovanni Mangone, a Lombard architect active in Rome during the 16th century.

== Location ==
The palace is located in Rome, in rione Borgo, in Borgo Santo Spirito 78, its main front almost facing the Palazzo del Commendatore, which is part of the Ospedale di Santo Spirito in Sassia complex. To the west, Via Scossacavalli separates Palazzo Alicorni from the Palazzo dei Penitenzieri, a remarkable Renaissance building: to the east, the building borders Via dell'Ospedale, whose name remembers the demolished Ospedale di San Carlo.

== History ==
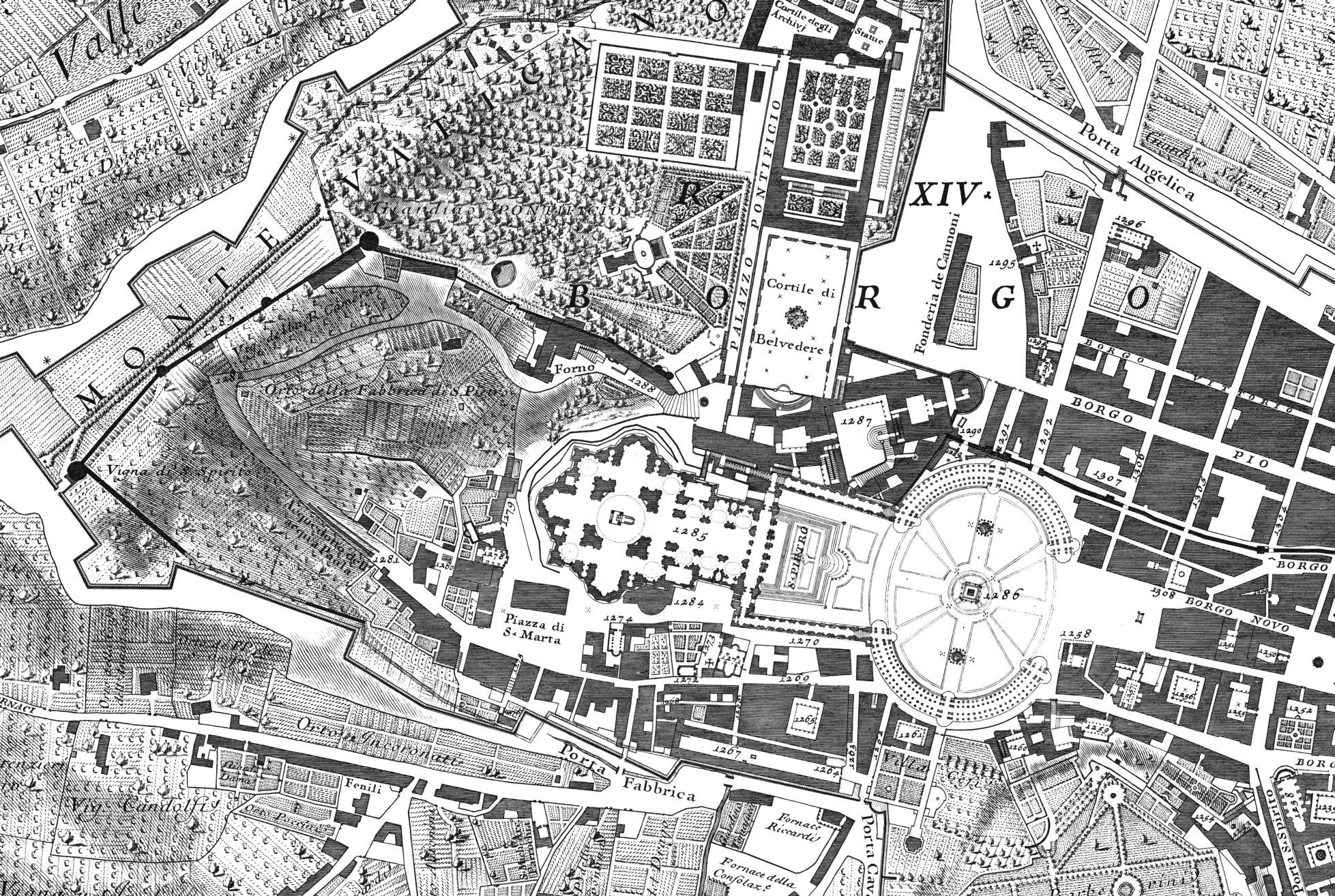
Original position of palazzo Alicorni (n. 1258), in front of the southern Colonnade of St. Peter, from Nuova Topografia di Roma by Giambattista Nolli (1748)

The Alicorni, an Albanian family, had escaped from their homeland during the reign of Pope Pius II (r. 1458–64), because of the Ottoman advance in their country. They settled first in Milan, then in Pavia, Forlì, and finally in Rome. They rose to high rank, partly because of several marriages with Italian noble families; among them were the Trivulzio and Pusterla from Milan, and the Capranica from Rome. Messer Traiano (also spelled Trajano) Alicorni, conservatore (one of the three counselors) of the city and primo cameriere of the pope, had his palace erected in Borgo at the beginning of the 16th century. The palace originally had its main facade along the Borgo Vecchio road. Two inns, named respectively Locanda del Leopardo and Locanda dell'Inferno (The Leopard and The Hell), had to be demolished to make room for the new building. Trajano Alicorni left two sons, Giovanni Battista and Fabio, who were both appointed knights by the Pope. In 1585, Giovanni Battista sold the palace to the French Cardinal Matteo Contarelli, Datarius of Pope Gregory XIII (r. 1572–85). Some months later the prelate died, leaving the palace to his heirs, who sold it again to others who neglected the building, which fell into disrepair. In 1667, the erection of the Colonnades of St. Peter's square by Gian Lorenzo Bernini made it necessary to pull down the last block of houses ("isola") in front of the new square: this was named "isola del Priorato", since one of the buildings hosted the Priory of the knights of Rhodes. After the erection of the new square, Palazzo Alicorni faced at a very short distance the southern Colonnade in an incongruous position, being isolated on three sides, with Piazza Rusticucci (the new vestibule of St. Peter's square, created through the demolition) to the north, via del Sant'Uffizio to the west, and the short, crooked lane named "Vicolo di Messer Traiano" (from Traiano Alicorni) to the east.

Until 1850, the palace was the seat of the Roman "Guardia civica" (in that year merged with another militia to form the Palatine Guard), thence it was named "Palazzo della Gran Guardia". In 1860, other edifices were erected near the palace, incorporating the rear lane and choking the building. Rome's land-use plan of 1882 foresaw the demolition of Palazzo Alicorni. On the contrary, in 1888 the comune of Rome bought it, destining it to primary school. In 1928 the Governatorato of Rome asked architect Adolfo Pernier to restore the building, which for the holy year of 1925 had been painted in yellow. The architect after an accurate survey brought the palace back to its original early 16th century pristine condition, removing all the later additions, including the balcony along Via del Sant'Uffizio. Only three years later, after the signing of the Lateran treaties, the edifice had to be pulled down in the wake of the definition of the border between Italy and the newly established state of Vatican City. Palazzo Alicorni was rebuilt in 1938 by architects Attilio Spaccarelli and Marcello Piacentini (the designers of Via della Conciliazione) along Borgo Santo Spirito, almost in front of the palace of the Commendatore, part of the complex of the hospital of Santo Spirito in Sassia.

After the end of World War II, the palace hosted the headquarters of the "Confcooperative" (the union of Italian catholic cooperatives), then became for many years a hotel, the "Hotel Pensione Alicorni". As of 2015 the building hosts the UCID ("Unione Cristiana Imprenditori Dirigenti"), an association of catholic entrepreneurs.

== Description ==
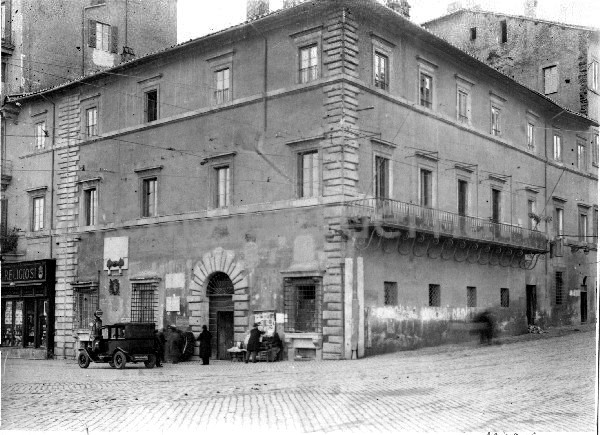
Palazzo Alicorni in its original position before its restoration in 1928, in a picture taken from northwest (Piazza Rusticucci, now Piazza Pio XII)

The original building has been documented through pictures shot in 1927, which show its state before the restoration of Pernier. They were taken by the "Istituto Luce", the propaganda agency founded by Mussolini. The building had two floors divided by belt courses, and a main front, first along Borgo Vecchio, after 1667 along Piazza Rusticucci, with five windows, a yard, and a portal framed by rustication. The fassade was characterised by angle bars reinforced with powerful rustication. The windows at the ground floor were adorned with corbels and bore a coping, being similar in style to those at the ground floor of the Palace of Angelo Massimo in rione Parione, erected in the same years.

The yard had a square plan, and was inspired by the impluvium of a Roman house. Its first order was constituted by two arched porticoes with doric columns, and the second and the third made up with two open galleries surmounted by an architrave. This was born by ionic columns, and was adorned with the coats of arms of the Alicorni (a silver unicorn with a golden horn on a green field) sculptured on the small pilasters of the balustrade at the first floor ("piano nobile"), and on the corinthian pilasters at the second floor.

In its renovation of 1928 Adolfo Pernier restored all these elements, which have been retained also in the reconstruction along Borgo Santo Spirito. Also the frames of the yard's doors and windows have been put in place again, but the 16th century doric frieze of the rooms, belonging to the school of the Zuccaris, and the wood ceiling of the ducal room have been lost. Other mannerist elements of the decoration, like grotesques interspersed with landscapes, have been detached and are now on display at the Museo di Roma. Also lost in the 1930s reconstruction were other elements which had given to the original palace a "bellicose" effect, as the grilles protecting the ground floor's windows, the loopholes lighting up two peperino-made secret stairs, once visible from vicolo di Messer Traiano, and the lookout towers above the roof. According to Pernier, all these elements suggest a military architect as the designer of this palace. This, according to the building's stylistic analysis, had been identified as Giovanni Mangone, a Lombard architect born in Caravaggio and active in Rome during the first half of the 16th century, whose only surely attributed work in this city is the Palazzo di Angelo Massimo (also known as Palazzo Massimo di Pirro) near Piazza Navona.

== Sources ==
- Borgatti, Mariano (1926). Borgo e S. Pietro nel 1300 – 1600 – 1925 (in Italian). Roma: Federico Pustet.
- Pernier, Rodolfo (1928). "Il Palazzo degli Alicornj a S. Pietro". Capitolium (in Italian) (4). Roma: Governatorato di Roma: 197–208. Archived from the original on 23 September 2015.
- Ceccarelli, Giuseppe (Ceccarius) (1938). La "Spina" dei Borghi (in Italian). Roma: Danesi.
- Gnoli, Umberto (1942). Alberghi ed osterie di Roma nella Rinascenza (in Italian). Roma: Maglione.
- Castagnoli, Ferdinando; Cecchelli, Carlo; Giovannoni, Gustavo; Zocca, Mario (1958). Topografia e urbanistica di Roma (in Italian). Bologna: Cappelli.
- Cambedda, Anna (1990). "La demolizione della Spina dei Borghi". Centro di Coordinamento Didattico, Assessorato Alla Cultura, Comune di Roma (in Italian). Roma: Fratelli Palombi Editori. ISSN 0394-9753.
- Laura Gigli (1990). Guide rionali di Roma (in Italian). Vol. Borgo (I). Roma: Fratelli Palombi Editori. ISSN 0393-2710.
- Gigli, Laura (1992). Guide rionali di Roma (in Italian). Vol. Borgo (III). Roma: Fratelli Palombi Editori. ISSN 0393-2710.
