= Justine Di Fiore =

American artist

Justine Di Fiore (born 1967) is a Los Angeles-based American artist known for her gestural figurative paintings. Her brightly-colored work explores themes of the body, mortality, and caregiving that frequently reflect her years as a nursing assistant in Minneapolis, Minnesota. In 2014, she was awarded an Artist Initiative Grant in Visual Art from the Minnesota State Arts Board.

== Early life and education ==
Di Fiore was born in Monterey, California and raised in the Bronx, NY. She earned her BA from Oberlin College and her MFA from the University of California, Davis.

== Work ==
With titles such as Nurse (2026) and Caring Is a Longing (2026), Di Fiore's paintings are based in nearly three decades of work in clinical settings as a nursing assistant. This professional caregiving grounds her engagement with the body, sometimes through an art historical lens as evident in the diptych Undergrowth (2024), which is a tribute to Michelangelo's Rondanini Pietà (1552–64). At the same time, this work attests to a more personal influence in caring for her late mother. According to art critic Zakiah Goff, "Di Fiore’s figures are often faceless, their identities slightly blurred or obscured. Without a fixed expression to guide interpretation, the focus moves to gesture, to touch, to the relationship between bodies."

== Select Solo Exhibitions ==
2026 Urgent Care, Dreamsong, Minneapolis, MN
2025 Pietà, The Bunker LA, Los Angeles, CA
2018 Magic Carpet, Pirsig Projects, Minneapolis, MN
