= Giovanni Mangone =

Italian sculptor

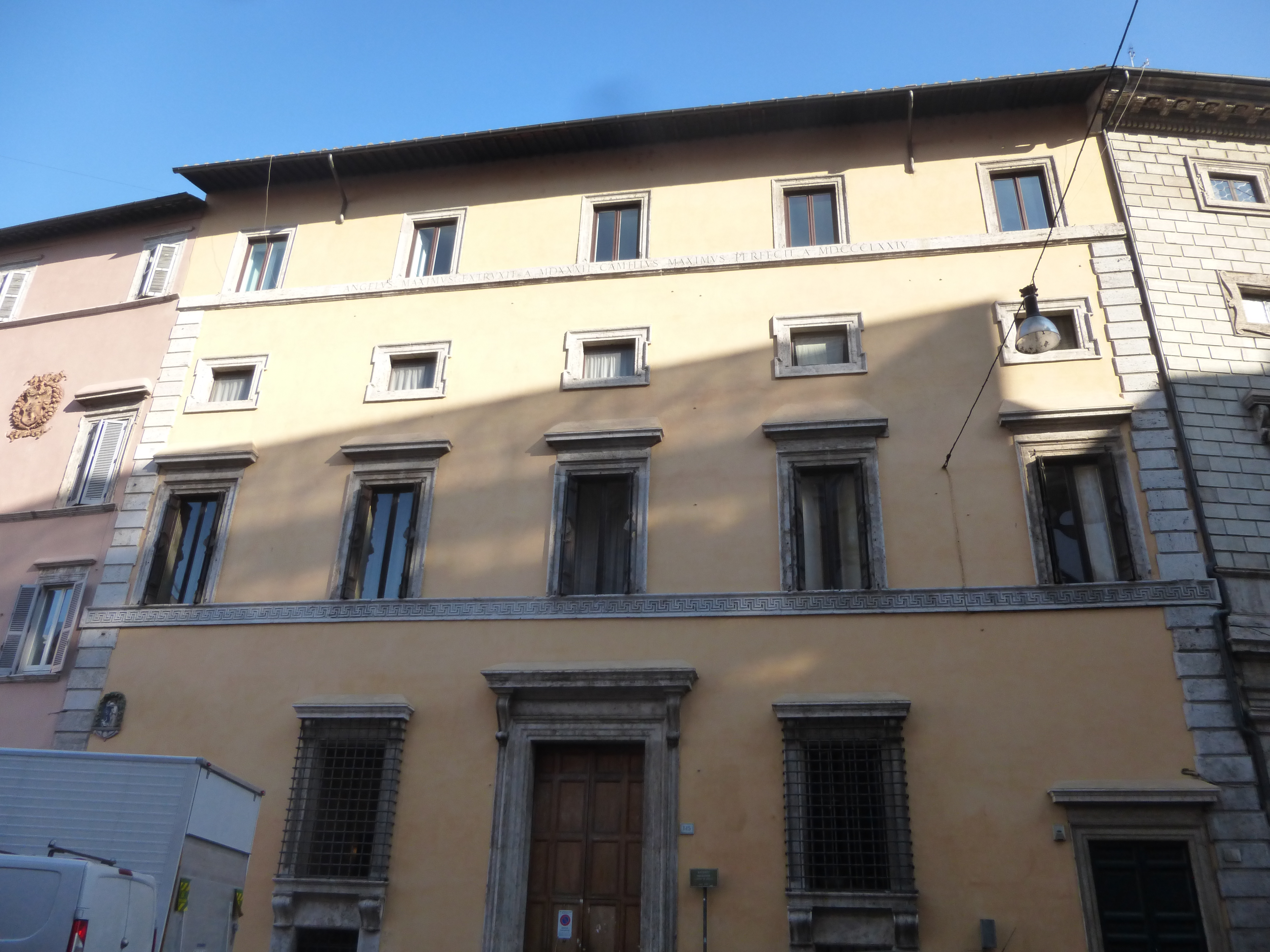
Palazzo Massimo di Pirro in Rome (today along Corso Vittorio Emanuele II) is the only building still extant surely designed by Giovanni Mangone

Giovanni Mangone (born towards the end of 15th century, died 25 June 1543) was an Italian artist active almost exclusively in Rome during the Renaissance. Mangone's skills were manifold: he worked as sculptor, architect, stonecutter and building estimator. Moreover, he was a keen antiquarian and among the founders of the Academy dei Virtuosi al Pantheon. As military engineer, he was renowned among his contemporaries.

== Life and works ==
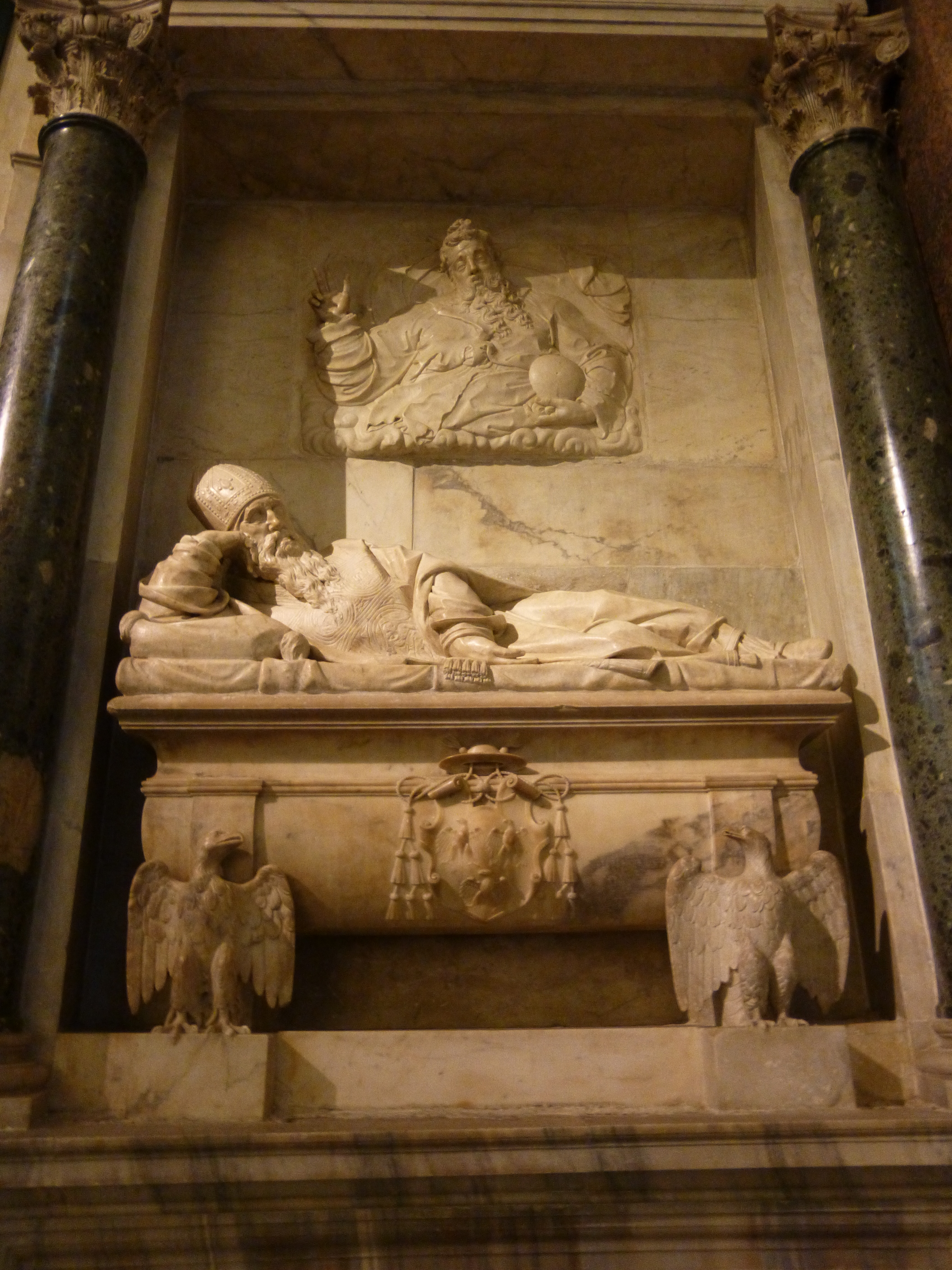
Tomb of Cardinal Willem van Enckevoirt at Santa Maria dell'Anima in Rome

Born around the end of the fifteenth century by Francesco, a native of Caravaggio in Lombardy, according to Giorgio Vasari he studied under sculptor and architect Andrea Ferrucci from Fiesole. In Rome, where he lived in a palace in via delle Coppelle, between Sant'Agostino and palazzo Baldassini, at the beginning of his career had several assignments; from 1527 to 1532 he was superintendent to the spring of S. Peter; until 1541, he was curator of the gold-leaf ceiling of the Basilica of Santa Maria Maggiore; since 1528 and until his death, he was architect of the apostolic Chamber. Moreover, during his whole career he worked also as building estimator.

In 1534 started his collaboration with Antonio da Sangallo the Younger: together they prepared apparati effimeri in wood to celebrate the crowning of Pope Paul III (r. 1534–49) and in 1536, the visit to Rome of Holy Roman Emperor Charles V.

In 1537 Mangone modified the monastery of the Servites near the Church of San Marcello al Corso, which he completed. However, due to subsequent changes in the seventeenth century, his work at the monastery is no longer recognizable.

Perhaps since 1532 he designed for Angelo Massimo a palace south of Piazza Navona, in rione Parione. The building, which in 1537 had been completed until its piano nobile, was erroneously named after king Pyrrhus of Epirus because of a statue (actually of Mars) once on display on a yard's niche and now at the Musei Capitolini. The edifice is adjacent to the palace named Palazzo Massimo alle Colonne, realized in those years by Baldassare Peruzzi and commissioned by Angelo's brother Pietro.

Palazzo Massimo di Pirro is Mangone's only certain architectural work still extant. In this building his model is Antonio da Sangallo the Younger, of whom he adopts typological schemes and – partially – stylistic features. Anyway, in several elements, like the design of the irregular yard, the adoption of loggias with architrave, the usage of decorative elements as corbels, the equilibrium of the façade, he shows an original style.

Based on stylistic analysis, have been attributed to him also the palazzo Alicorni in Borgo Vecchio (later piazza Rusticucci) in Borgo (demolished in 1931 and later rebuilt) and – more doubtfully – the Palazzetto De Vellis in Piazza Santa Maria in Trastevere.

As a sculptor, only two works have been attributed to him: well-done appears to be the funerary monument to Cardinal Willem van Enckevoirt (dead in 1534) in Santa Maria dell'Anima, where is evident an influence from Michelangelo, while that of the bishop of Chiusi and Governor of Bologna Gregorio Magalotti in Santa Cecilia in Trastevere, engraved in 1538, radiates a cold feeling.

As a military architect, in 1542 Mangone was summoned together with other architects by Paul III, who wanted to enhance the fortifications of Borgo, and in that occasion he presented a project. The following year he was active in Sermoneta, working at the town's walls. Mangone was also a keen antiquarian, and collected in his palace a good deal of architectural and sculptural pieces. In 1543, defining himself as a sculptor, he was among the founding members of the Congregation of "St. Joseph in the Holy Land at the Rotonda", later known as the Accademia dei Virtuosi al Pantheon, one of the main centers of discussions about antiquities and architecture in Rome.

On 25 June 1543 he made his will, dying perhaps on the same day.

== Significance ==
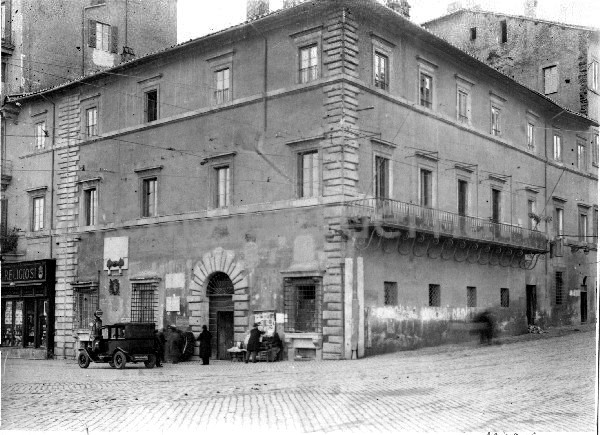
Palazzo Alicorni (here before its demolition in 1931 and later reconstruction) could be attributed to Mangone because of its stylistic resemblance with the Palazzo di Pirro

As a sculptor, Mangone followed Andrea Sansovino, reaching mixed results.

As an architect, his former education as a sculptor and stonemason in the design of moldings allowed him to reach a remarkable equilibrium of proportions. Moreover, Mangone was among the first to spread the "severe" style initiated by Antonio da Sangallo the Younger. With the Palazzo di Pirro, he designed a good example of "everyday" architecture which found many imitators in the second part of 16th century. As a military architect, although he was praised by the military engineer Francesco De Marchi, the absence of extant works which can be attributed to him makes difficult to assess its real contribution to this field.
