= Giovanni Battista della Marca =

Italian painter

Giovanni Battista della Marca (1532–1587) was an Italian painter of the Renaissance period.

He was also called Lombardelli and il Montano, and was born in Montenovo. He was first a pupil of Marco da Faenza, and, according to Baglione, visited Rome during the papacy of Gregory XIII, painting in the style influenced by Raffaellino da Reggio, whom he assisted in some fresco paintings in the Vatican. For the church of San Pietro in Montorio, he painted a series of pictures of the Life of St. Francis, for the church of Santa Maria ai Monti, a Resurrection, and for the church of San Michele Arcangelo ai Corridori di Borgo a fresco with St. Michael, the Archangel. There are several works of his in the churches at Montenuovo.
