= The Deposition (Michelangelo) =

Sculpture by Michelangelo

The Deposition (The Florentine Pietà)
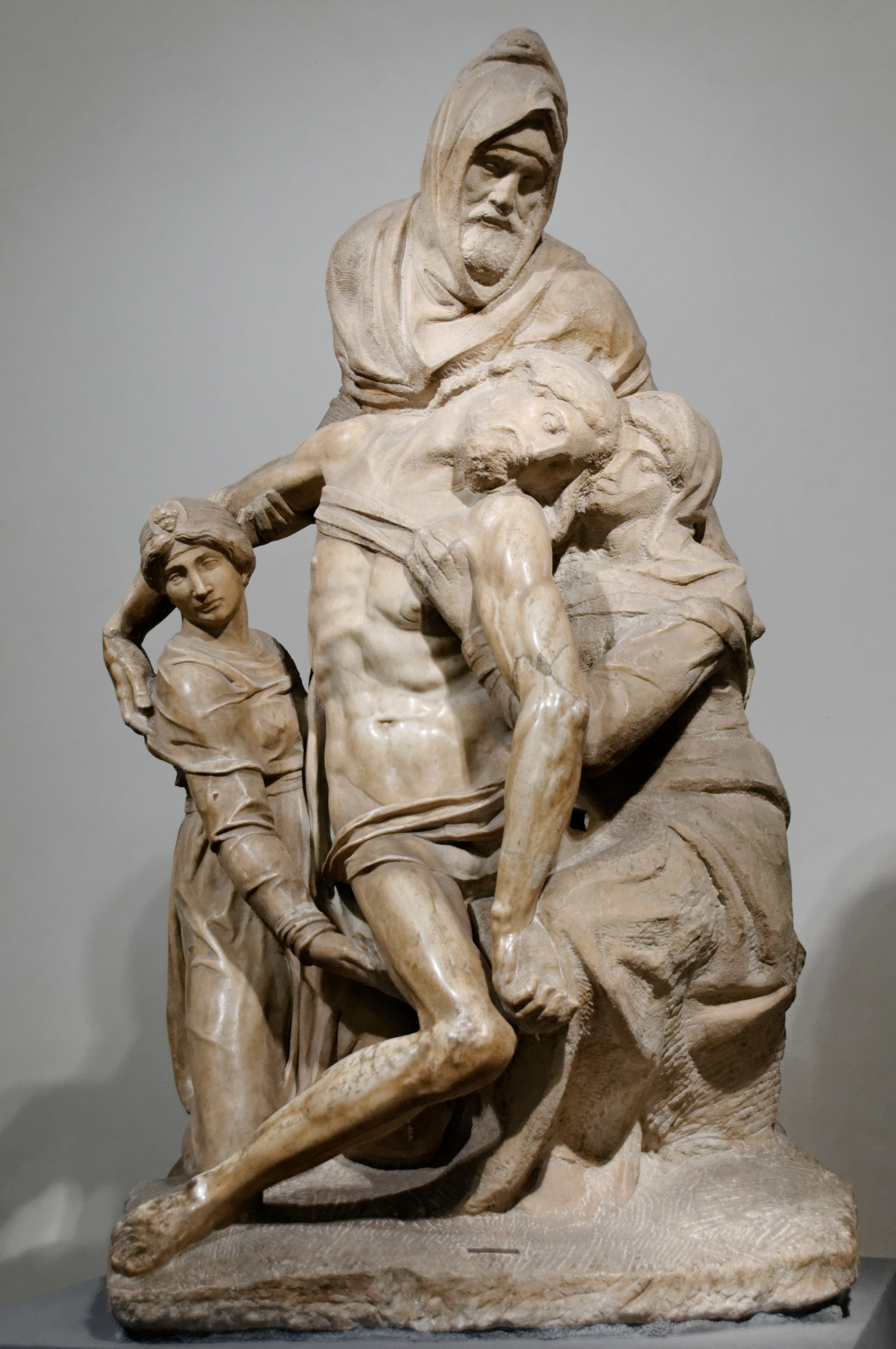
- Artist: Michelangelo
- Year: c. 1547–1555
- Type: Marble
- Dimensions: 277 cm (109 in)
- Location: Museo dell'Opera del Duomo, Florence
- Preceded by: Brutus (Michelangelo)
- Followed by: Rondanini Pietà

The Deposition (also called the Bandini Pietà or The Lamentation over the Dead Christ) is a marble sculpture by the Italian High Renaissance master Michelangelo. The sculpture, on which Michelangelo worked between 1547 and 1555, depicts four figures: the dead body of Jesus Christ, newly taken down from the Cross, Nicodemus (or possibly Joseph of Arimathea), Mary Magdalene and the Virgin Mary. The sculpture is housed in the Museo dell'Opera del Duomo in Florence and is therefore also known as the Florentine Pietà.

According to Vasari, Michelangelo originally made the sculpture to decorate his tomb in Santa Maria Maggiore in Rome. He later sold it, however, before completion of the work after intentionally damaging Christ's left arm and leg and removing several components for reasons still under debate. Some experts believe it was because the marble was flawed and the sculpture could not be completed without the addition of a piece of marble from another block ("piecing").

Vasari noted that Michelangelo began to work on the sculpture around the age of 72. Without commission, Michelangelo worked tirelessly into the night with just a single candle to illuminate his work. Vasari wrote that he began to work on this sculpture to amuse his mind and to keep his body healthy. After 8 years of working on it, Michelangelo would go on and attempt to destroy the work in a fit of frustration. This marked the end of Michelangelo's work on the sculptural group, which found itself in the hands of Francesco Bandini, who hired an apprentice sculptor, by the name of Tiberio Calcagni, to restore the work to its current composition. The left leg of Christ is missing. Since its inception, the sculpture has been plagued by ambiguities and never-ending interpretations, with no straightforward answers available.

The face of Nicodemus under the hood is considered to be a self-portrait of Michelangelo himself.

== Composition ==
The composition of this work has caused controversy and debate since its creation. Art historians have argued back and forth about what scene or scenes are being presented as well as the true identity of the hooded figure encapsulating the scene. Though it is regarded as a Pietà out of tradition, there is substantial evidence that suggests that this work could either be a deposition, a Pietà, an entombment, or perhaps a scene that depicts all three. The only way to truly know which scene or scenes are being depicted lies within the identity of the hooded figure.

The identities of the other three figures in this work are relatively clear. The body of Christ just after his crucifixion in the middle, being assisted by a distraught Virgin Mary to his left and a cold and distant Mary Magdalene to his right. All three of the known figures are in some way helped by the hooded figure in supporting Christ's body. The hooded figure can be one of two people or even both. Historians argue that the figure can either be Joseph of Arimathea or Nicodemus, the latter of which is most generally accepted. Conventionally speaking, Joseph of Arimathea is usually shown with a beard and broods over Christ's head, in the same manner as the depicted figure. On the other hand, this figure could be Nicodemus who is typically shown with some type of head covering, which would be the hood in this case. Both Joseph and Nicodemus had significant roles in Christ's final days and the subsequent actions after his death. Joseph gave up his tomb for Christ to use and he helped remove Christ's body from the cross. Nicodemus moreover, had a conversation with Christ about how one could be born again and obtain eternal life. From that conversation on, Nicodemus became involved with Christ and also aided Joseph of Arimathea in Christ's deposition. Since both Joseph and Nicodemus were involved in the deposition, there is a strong argument that that is the scene being shown, so much so that to some, this work is known as The Deposition. Christ's serpentine-shaped body sulks heavily in the arms of his loved ones as if he were in the process of descending from the cross straight into his mother's arms. The pained expression on the Virgin's face would resemble the look on her face upon first seeing her dead child with surrounding figures being there to support her.

Another possibility about what scene is being staged is the Pietà. The Pietà scene has been a strong continuity in Michelangelo's work. Throughout his life, Michelangelo has drawn hundreds of Pietas and has sculpted two others: the St. Peter's Pietà, and the Rondanini Pietà. Because of Michelangelo's attachment to the Pietà, or the Virgin's Suffering, this poses a decent argument that this is a Pietà despite its unconventional representation. Traditionally, this scene is only shared between the Virgin Mary and Christ's body without onlookers and other participants such as Magdalene and the unknown hooded figure. The Pietà is generally supposed to be a scene to highlight the huge sacrifice Christ had to make to follow through with his prophecy. Special emphasis is often put on the Virgin's pain instead of Christ's lifeless body. The presence of the other figures argues against the possibility of Michelangelo's work being just a Pietà.

A third possibility about the scene being depicted here is an entombment. Entombment scenes have habitually involved Mary Magdalene and Joseph of Arimathea as well as a few other people. It is unknown whether or not the Virgin was present during Christ's entombment because only one of the apostles recorded her presence, so she is rarely depicted. The cold expression on Magdalene's face suggests that some time has gone by since Christ's death insinuating that this is an entombment rather than a deposition. The deciding factor, however, again lies within the identity of the hooded figure. If it was a known fact that this character was Nicodemus, then this could not be an entombment because he was not present at the burial. (see The Gospel of John 19:39 – which has Nicodemus accompanying Joseph of Arimathea to the tomb and preparing Jesus' body together) Joseph of Arimathea, furthermore, was given the job of placing Christ's body in the tomb, so if this is Joseph, there is abundant evidence that suggests this could be an entombment scene.

A fourth possibility about what is going on in this sculpture is that this is a combination of all three scenes crammed into one. The notion of combining multiple scenes had become popular in paintings. On one canvas, artists could cram three or four different scenes to give a narrative being read from either left to right, top to bottom, and even from one side to another in a zig-zag form. Though popular in paintings, this technique had not quite made its way into sculpture. Since Michelangelo stated that work was begun to keep him entertained in his final years, he could have been experimenting with this technique. Scholars believe that if the work is circumnavigated from the viewer's right to the viewer's left, it does narrate the three-step process of Christ's deposition, the Pietà, and the entombment. On the far right side, one can make out a deposition. Seeing just the Virgin, Christ, and the hooded figure, the viewer can make out Christ's descent from the cross. If this is the case, then the hooded figure would represent both Nicodemus and Joseph of Arimathea simultaneously. From the front central view, the Virgin's suffering comes into play. The Nicodemus figure is made out to appear as though he is handing Christ off to her, gently placing him in her lap. Finally, from the far left, the Magdalene accompanies the Virgin as she hands off her son to Joseph of Arimathea for him to place in the tomb. It is unclear which of these possibilities is actually true, but due to the conventions and traditions surrounding this sculpture, art historians and other scholars stand by that this is a Pietà and the hooded figure is Nicodemus.

== Destruction ==
One night in 1555, Michelangelo attacked the group in a moment of frustration in an attempt to completely destroy it. He broke off numerous limbs from the figure. Vasari noted that Michelangelo had complained about a vein in the marble causing problems for him continuously while carving. Another factor that intensified Michelangelo's frustration was that his servant Urbino had been bothering him to finish it. Despite all of these factors, they still are not big enough for Michelangelo to just throw away eight years of work from a momentary lapse of reason. Ambiguities and unexplained aspects on Michelangelo's part are at the center of interpretation of this work. Art historians have found possible answers that explain on a deeper level the dissatisfaction he had with the sculpture. They theorize that Michelangelo could have had significant problems with both the growing sexual motif of a slung leg over another's lap, and with the persecution of the Nicodemists.

The slung leg theory has been summed up by a multitude of historians. The theory suggests that at this time, it had become a growing motif. A leg slung over another's lap is a symbol of a romantic and intimate relationship between the two involved. The leg represents one taking possession over the other in such a way that is both symbiotic and respectable at the same time. The two involved are in a caring relationship that presents a sense of eroticism. In the context of this sculpture, it would have been acceptable to keep it as is. At the time, there had been manuscripts and catechisms that explain the relationship between Christ and the Virgin. The Virgin, in this relationship, would represent the church as Christ's bride. Having grown up in the church, Michelangelo would have been well aware of this relationship. Despite his knowledge on the Virgin and Christ's relationship, Michelangelo wanted the leg to simply and lifelessly hang over the Virgin's lap as an act of innocence. The slung leg in Michelangelo's sculpture would not have represented the couple in a sexual manner but in a realistic manner. Without life in Christ's body, his limbs are forced to fall involuntarily over the Virgin's. In order to avoid confusion about his intentions, Michelangelo may have removed Christ's left leg in order to later change its composition to something that would be interpreted correctly. If this is the case, Michelangelo might not have attacked the stone to destroy it, but instead to change its structure.

One of the more commendable theories about the Pietà's destruction is explained by the iconography of the hooded figure and the inclusion of Michelangelo's self-portrait as the face of the figure. The representation of Michelangelo's face on Nicodemus solidifies his ties to a specific belief of his known as Nicodemism. Michelangelo was introduced to a group known as the Spirituali by his friend Vittoria Colonna. This group practiced Nicodemism from the 1540s to the mid-1550s. Nicodemists agreed with Protestant beliefs on nearly all their bases except for the Protestants' need to break away from the Catholic Church. Nicodemists wanted to avoid a schism from the church at all costs. However, they also believed that salvation could be reached through baptism, communion, and faith alone. By 1555, Pope Paul IV had been elected head of the Catholic Church and almost instantly launched a Roman Inquisition. This inquisition persecuted anyone who spoke out against the Catholic Church, deeming them as heretics. Upon this inquisition, Michelangelo began to fear for not only his life but also for those he knew including those who were involved with the Spirituali. According to this theory Michelangelo was forced into secrecy. Knowing that he would be questioned sooner or later by the Pope and that the self-portrait showing him as Nicodemus would be used as truly convicting evidence of his beliefs, he destroyed the work. However, John Edwards points out that no damage was done to the figure or face of "Nicodemus" which left in place the single most condemning element of the sculptural group. This, Edwards asserts, casts doubt as to the question of Michelangelo's fear of being seen as holding heretical views. Therefore, the identification of the hooded figure as Nicodemus is in question.

Each of these theories are plausible and even more plausible than that, all of the reasons could have worked together to create a climactic realization of the poor timing Michelangelo had in composing the sculpture the way he did. No matter what the final straw was, the attempted destruction marked the end of Michelangelo's involvement with it. The work was then given away as a gift to one of Michelangelo's servants and was eventually sold to Francesco Bandini.

== Restoration ==
Upon receiving the Pietà, Francesco Bandini asked a young sculptor apprentice by the name of Tiberio Calcagni to restore the work. Calcagni used models provided by Michelangelo himself on which to base his repairs. In his restoration, Calcagni reattached the limbs of Mary Magdalene, the Virgin's fingers, Christ's left nipple, Christ's left arm and elbow, and Christ's right arm and hand. The only thing that was not reattached was Christ's left leg. Calcagni caused controversy with the changes he made to the Magdalene's face. It has been noted that prior to the destruction of the Florentine Pietà the Magdalene's face also reflected the pain shown on the Virgin's. The change in her face altered the overall tone of this work. She was no longer in complete anguish but instead was now disassociated from and uninvolved with the rest of the scene. Calcagni is often criticized for Magdalene's odd proportions and small figure compared to the others in the composition, but the overall composition and structure of the sculpture were Michelangelo’s own decisions. The Sculpture stayed with the Bandini family in Rome until 1671 when it was sold to Cosimo III. Cosimo III brought the sculpture to Florence. The Florentine Pietà currently resides in the Museo dell‘Opera del Duomo, but was earlier in the Duomo.

== See also ==
- List of statues of Jesus
- List of works by Michelangelo

== Bibliography ==
- Hibbard, Howard (1974). Michelangelo (2nd ed.). Harper & Row. ISBN 9780064333238.
- Shrimplin-Evangelidis, Valerie (1989). "Michelangelo and Nicodemism: The Florentine Pietà". Art Bulletin. 71 (1): 58–66. doi:10.2307/3051214. JSTOR 3051214.
- Steinberg, Leo (1968). "Michelangelo's Florentine Pietà: The Missing Leg". Art Bulletin. 50 (4): 343–353.
- Wasserman, Jack (2003). Michelangelo's Florence Pietà. Princeton and Oxford: Princeton University Press. ISBN 9780691016214.
