= Santa Maria Annunziata in Borgo =

Chiesa di Santa Maria Annunziata in Borgo
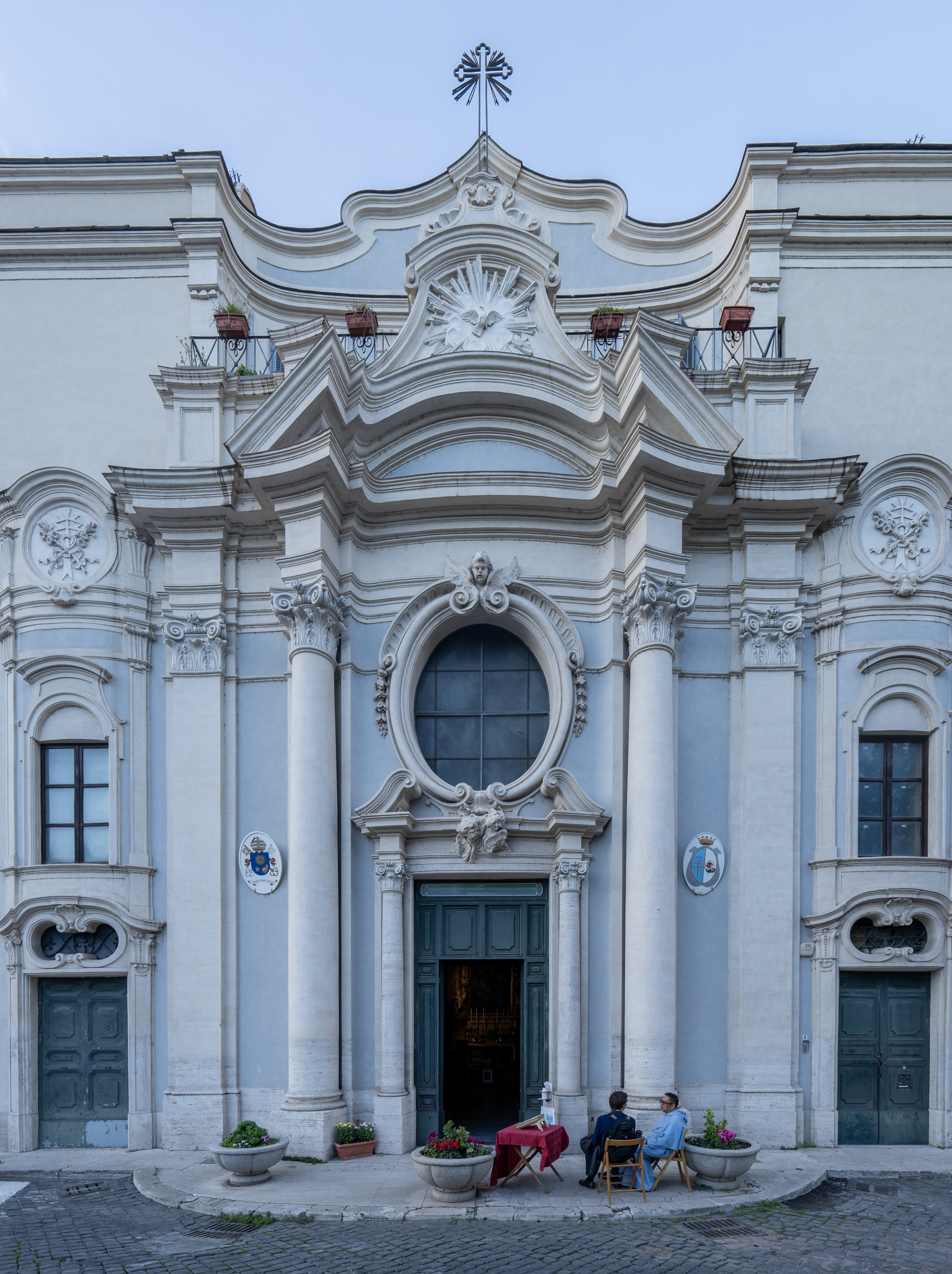
- Façade of the Church of Santa Maria Annunziata in Borgo
- Click on the map for a fullscreen view
- 41°54′06.69″N 12°27′48.98″E
- Location: Borgo, Rome
- Country: Italy
- Denomination: Roman Catholic
- Tradition: Latin Rite

History
- Consecrated: 1745

Architecture
- Architect: Pietro Passalacqua
- Style: Baroque
- Groundbreaking: 1742

Administration
- Province: Rome

Santa Maria Annunziata in Borgo, popularly known as Nunziatina (or Annunziatina), is an oratory of Rome (Italy), in the rione Borgo, facing on Lungotevere Vaticano.

== History ==
The church of S. Maria Annunziata was founded in 1688 as the Oratory of the Archconfraternity of the nearby Ospedale di Santo Spirito in Sassia. Between 1742 and 1745 the church was rebuilt along Borgo Santo Spirito, by architect Pietro Passalacqua.

In 1940, due to the opening of Via della Conciliazione, the oratory was dismantled and re-built ten years later in the present location facing the Tiber at the insistence of the Archconfraternity of the Holy Spirit who opposed the expropriation until they obtained the promise that the church would be rebuilt, identical to the original, in the immediate vicinity. The furnishings were transported from the old church. It opened during the Holy Year of 1950.

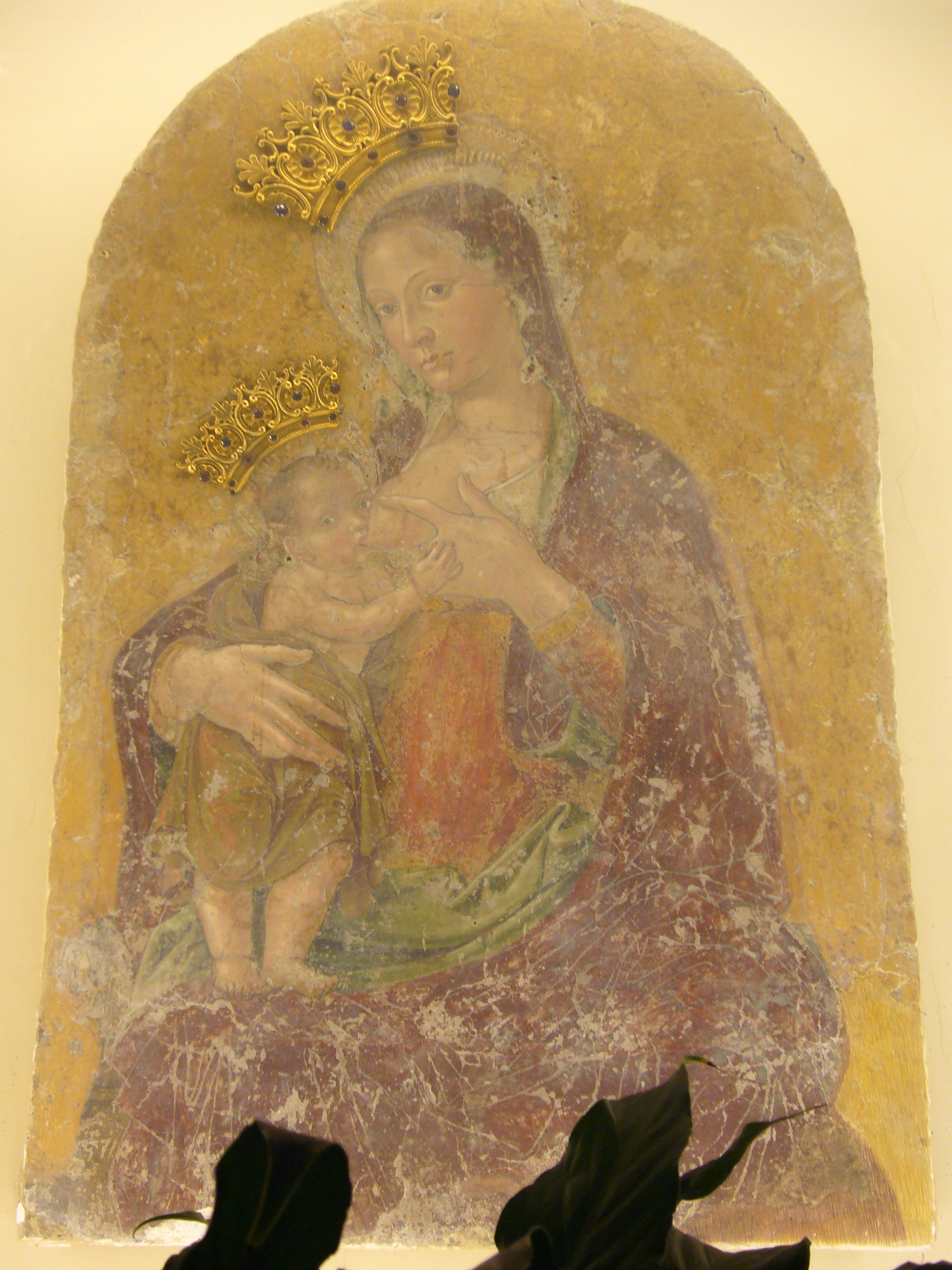
Virgin of the Milk with the Child, fresco attributed to Antoniazzo Romano. It was canonically crowned on December 8, 1926

== Description ==
The façade is one of the most refined examples of the 18th-century style in Rome.

The interior has a single nave with plaster decorations. It houses works of art formerly in the little church of San Michele Arcangelo ai Corridori di Borgo, lying along Borgo Sant'Angelo, demolished in 1939 in order to enlarge the Borgo S.Angelo and via della Traspontina. Among them, a detached fresco portraying the Virgin of the Milk with the Child, attributed to Antoniazzo Romano, and a lunette with the Apparition of St. Michael Archangel to Pope Gregory the Great.

Next to the entrance is a statue of St. Michael the Archangel fighting with Lucifer", attributed to Louis-Albert Lefeuvre.

== Sources ==
- Mariano Armellini, Le chiese di Roma dal secolo IV al XIX, Rome 1891, p. 773
- C. Rendina, Le Chiese di Roma, Newton & Compton Editori, Milan 2000, p. 35-36
- C. Villa, Rione XIV Borgo, in AA.VV, I rioni di Roma, Newton & Compton Editori, Milan 2000, Vol. III, pp. 924–967
