= Borgo Santo Spirito =

Thoroughfare in Rome, Italy

Coordinates: 41°54′06″N 12°27′45″E

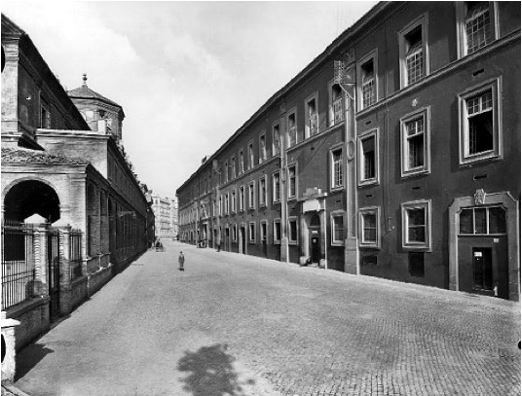
- The road with the façade of the Ospedale di San Carlo (right) and the Ospedale di Santo Spirito (left) in the 1930s
- Interactive map of Borgo Santo Spirito
- Former name: Burgus Saxonum; Burgus Frisonum; Borgo San Michele; Borgo San Martino
- Location: Rome, Italy
- Quarter: Borgo
- East end: Via San Pio X
- West end: Largo degli Alicorni

Borgo Santo Spirito is a street in Rome, Italy, important for historical and artistic reasons. From a historical point of view, it is considered the most interesting street in the Borgo district. Of medieval origin, it is linked to the foundation of the ancient fortified hospice for pilgrims from England, the Burgus Saxonum. The street houses the oldest Roman hospital, the Arcispedale di Santo Spirito in Saxia, which gave it its name. Heavily altered during the works for the opening of Via della Conciliazione, it nevertheless avoided the fate of the two parallel streets of Borgo Nuovo and Borgo Vecchio, both destroyed.

== Location ==
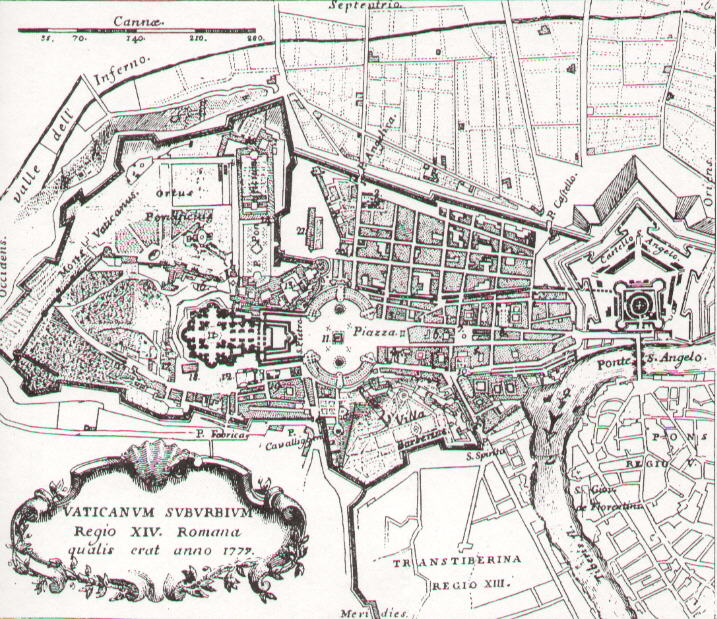
Borgo in 1779 (map printed by Monaldini). Borgo Santo Spirito is the first street starting from the south among the seven radiating from the Castle

The street is located in Rome, in the Borgo rione, and extends in an east–west direction from Via San Pio X to Largo degli Alicorni. Until 1870, the present Via dei Penitenzieri between house numbers 12 and 32 was also part of Borgo Santo Spirito.

== Denominations ==
In the early Middle Ages, the eastern part of the street was called Borgo dei Sassoni, while the western part was called Borgo dei Frisoni or Borgo San Michele, and the one further west Borgo San Martino.

The name Borgo, used instead of Via for Borgo Santo Spirito as well as for the main streets of the district, derives from the Anglo-Saxon word Burg ("fortified centre"), which denoted the Saxon pilgrims' fortified complex (Burgus Saxonum) located between the Circus of Nero and the Tiber.

== Roman Age ==
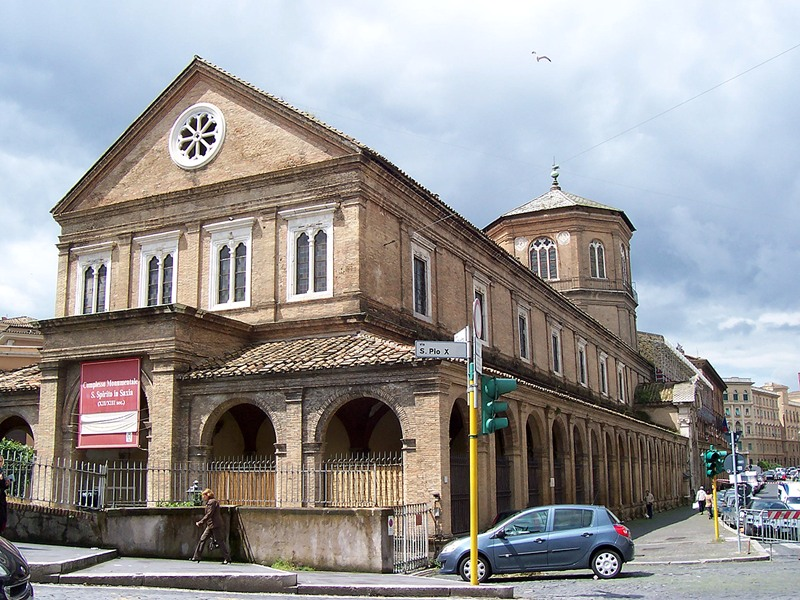
The Hospital of Santo Spirito in Sassia along Borgo S. Spirito

During the Roman period no road existed on the route of the modern Borgo Santo Spirito: however, a few metres south of the modern street, ran the Roman road that departed from the Pons Neronianus. Remains of the road have been found under the Corsia Sistina ("Sixtine lane") of the Santo Spirito hospital and under the Generalate ("Curia Generalizia") of the Jesuits. This road was used during the late Empire by emperors who, during their increasingly rare visits to the capital, after crossing the Tiber on the Pons Helius (Nero's bridge had been already demolished for defensive reasons), made their way along the route at the foot of the Janiculum to Saint Peter's tomb.

== Middle Ages ==
In the early Middle Ages, the future Borgo Santo Spirito was a path flanked by two walls, with vegetable gardens and a few small houses, leading from the square of the old church of Santa Maria in Traspontina (almost opposite Castel Sant'Angelo) towards the old Vatican Basilica. At the beginning of the road towards the Tiber, some tanners had settled down, who gave their name to a winding alley, called dei Macellari ("Butchers' lane") or degli Spellari ("Tanners' lane"), which joined the road to the Tiber and later also to the Portica (the covered passage connecting Castel Sant'Angelo to St. Peter's), the future Borgo Vecchio. At the beginning of the alley along the river there was a small harbour, called della Traspontina.

At that time, the pilgrimage to the tomb of the Apostle Peter through the Via Francigena had become common among the Britons. In 689, Caedwalla of Wessex, king of the Saxons, made a pilgrimage to Rome. The same did in 727 his successor Ine of Wessex who, after abdicating in favour of his relative Æthelheard, had a building built near the Tiber to house clergymen and princes from his kingdom, imposing for its maintenance a tribute called Rome scot. The complex, called Schola Saxonum or Burgus Saxonum, was extended by Offa, king of Mercia, who built for the British pilgrims traveling to Rome a xenodochium with a small church called Santa Maria in Saxia.

The schola, destroyed by two fires in 817 and 852, suffered severe damage during the Saracen incursion against Rome in 846. After this, Pope Leo IV (r. 847–855) protected St Peter's and its surroundings with the walls that still bear his name. On this occasion it is possible that the Scholae were included inside the circuit of the new walls. The Schola Saxonum, restored again by Leo IV after the sack, was ruined by the conflict between Pope Gregory VII (r. 1073–1085) and Emperor Henry IV of Franconia. The latter had fortified the ruins of the so-called Villa di Nerone ("Nero's Villa") on the high ground of the Palatiolum, the northernmost offshoot of the Janiculum Hill overlooking to the south the western part of the street. Moreover, after the Norman conquest of England in 1066, the sending of tribute for the maintenance of the schola ceased.

In 1167, Frederick Barbarossa definitively destroyed the fortified complex. Before Innocent III, the Schola Saxonum was turned into a hospital. In 1204, Innocent had Guy de Montpellier come to Rome, and entrusted the hospital, rebuilt by Marchionne Aretino, to the Order of the Holy Ghost. The hospital expanded considerably until the end of the 14th century, acquiring many houses in the Borgo. It declined like the whole city during the Avignon Papacy. It was seriously damaged in 1409 by Ladislaus of Naples, and was later almost abandoned. Pope Eugene IV (r. 1431–1447) and above all Pope Sixtus IV (r. 1471–1484) had the hospital restored and enlarged. The latter entrusted the work to Florentine architect Baccio Pontelli; among others he designed the Corsia Sistina, a 126 m-long (413 ft) hall with three rows of beds, flanked by a portico under which the homeless could sleep, to whom what was left over from the canteen was distributed.

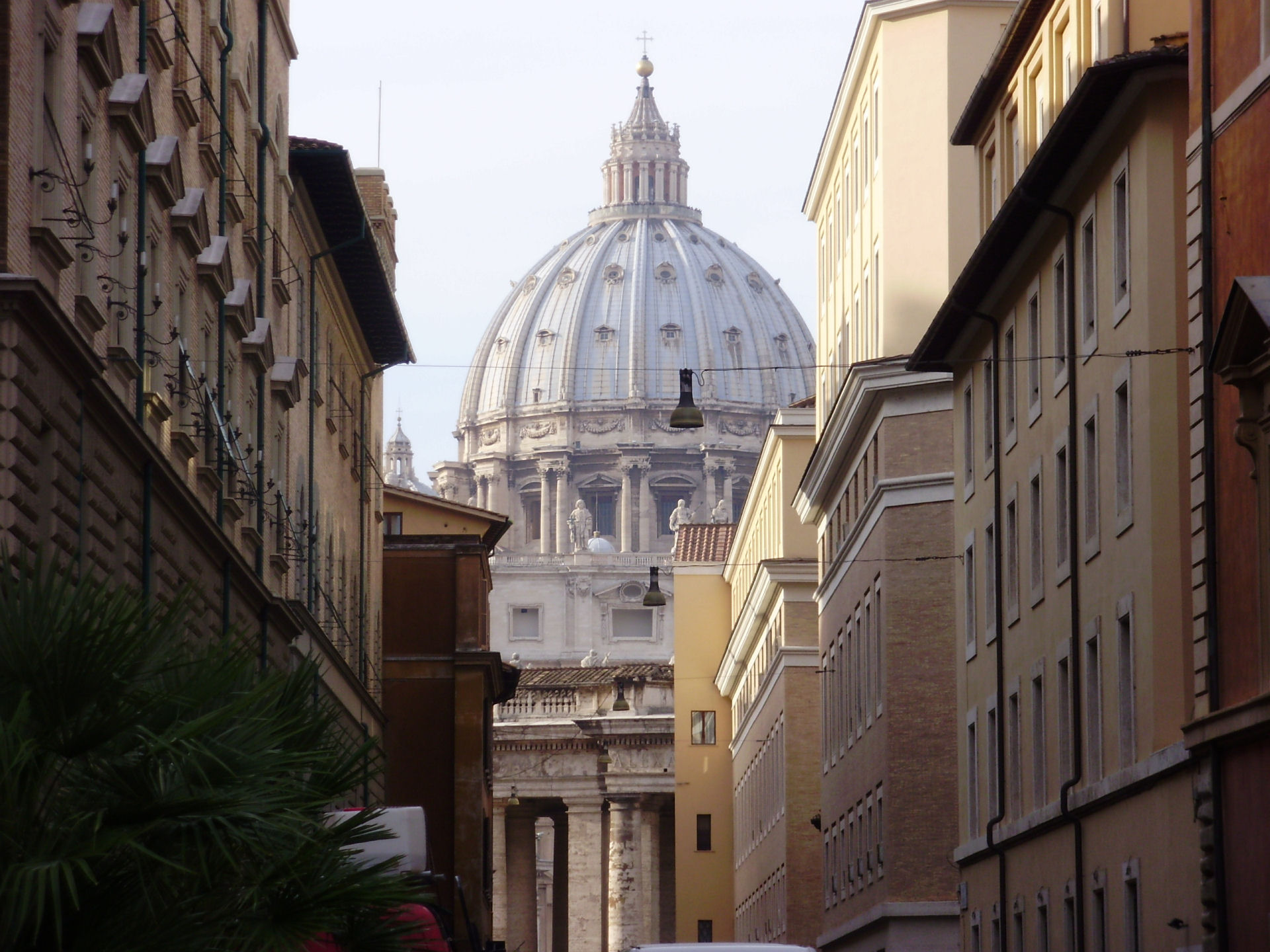
View of St. Peter's Dome from Borgo Santo Spirito

Beyond the hospital, the church of Santa Maria in Saxia was rebuilt in 1363 and restored by Eugene IV. Due to Pontelli's work, the church was demolished, but Pope Sixtus founded a new one, Santo Spirito in Sassia, which he left unfinished. In front of the church there was a small alley, called Vicolo Geremia, connecting the street with the Portica. Going westwards, on the northern side lay Vicolo dell'Ospedale, near which there were the houses belonging to the Tomacelli and Migliorati families, and on the left the Via Settimiana (today's Via dei Penitenzieri) leading to Trastevere.

After this crossroads the Burgus changed its name, and was called Burgus Frisonum ("Burg of the Frisians"), because of the schola founded there in the eight century by the Anglo-Saxon bishop Boniface. The schola, like the others, was founded to provide shelter for Frisian pilgrims, i.e. the inhabitants of the coastal areas between Denmark and today's Belgian Flanders, who were on their pilgrimage to Rome. On the left there was a slope (the future slope of Villa Cecchini) going to the ruins of the so-called palace of Nero, or Palatiolum, and to the small church of Santa Maria in Palazzolo, which was given to the Canons of St. Peter by Leo IV. On the right were some houses owned in the 15th century by Cesare Borgia, and on the left two alleys (the first no longer existing, and the second transformed into a flight of steps) leading up to the national church of the Frisians, San Michele, later Santi Michele e Magno, mentioned for the first time in 854. Proceeding further westwards, one arrived at Borgo San Martino, which extended between two blocks formed by houses and little churches. To the north Santa Maria dei Vergari and San Gregorio de Cortina, to the south San Martino. In this area was also located the Schola Armeniorum, or School of the Armenians, established either by Innocent III in 1202 or by Honorius III (r. 1216–1227).

In the two blocks of San Martino and San Gregorio in the late Middle Ages, there were several inns with lodgings: among them were the inns of the chiavi ("keys"), of the colomba ("dove") and of the cavallo ("horse"). In addition, there were several shops of Paternostrari (or Coronari), i.e. sellers of sacred images, and of Vergari, who sold the Bordone del pellegrino (pilgrim's staff), i.e. the staff used by pilgrims on their way to St. Peter's. After these two blocks, the Borgo merged in the old St. Peter's Square. Until the beginning of the Renaissance, Borgo Vecchio and Borgo Santo Spirito were the only streets that allowed pilgrims coming from the left bank of the Tiber to reach the Vatican Basilica. Because of this, both streets were paved by Pope Nicholas V (r. 1447–1455).

== Renaissance ==
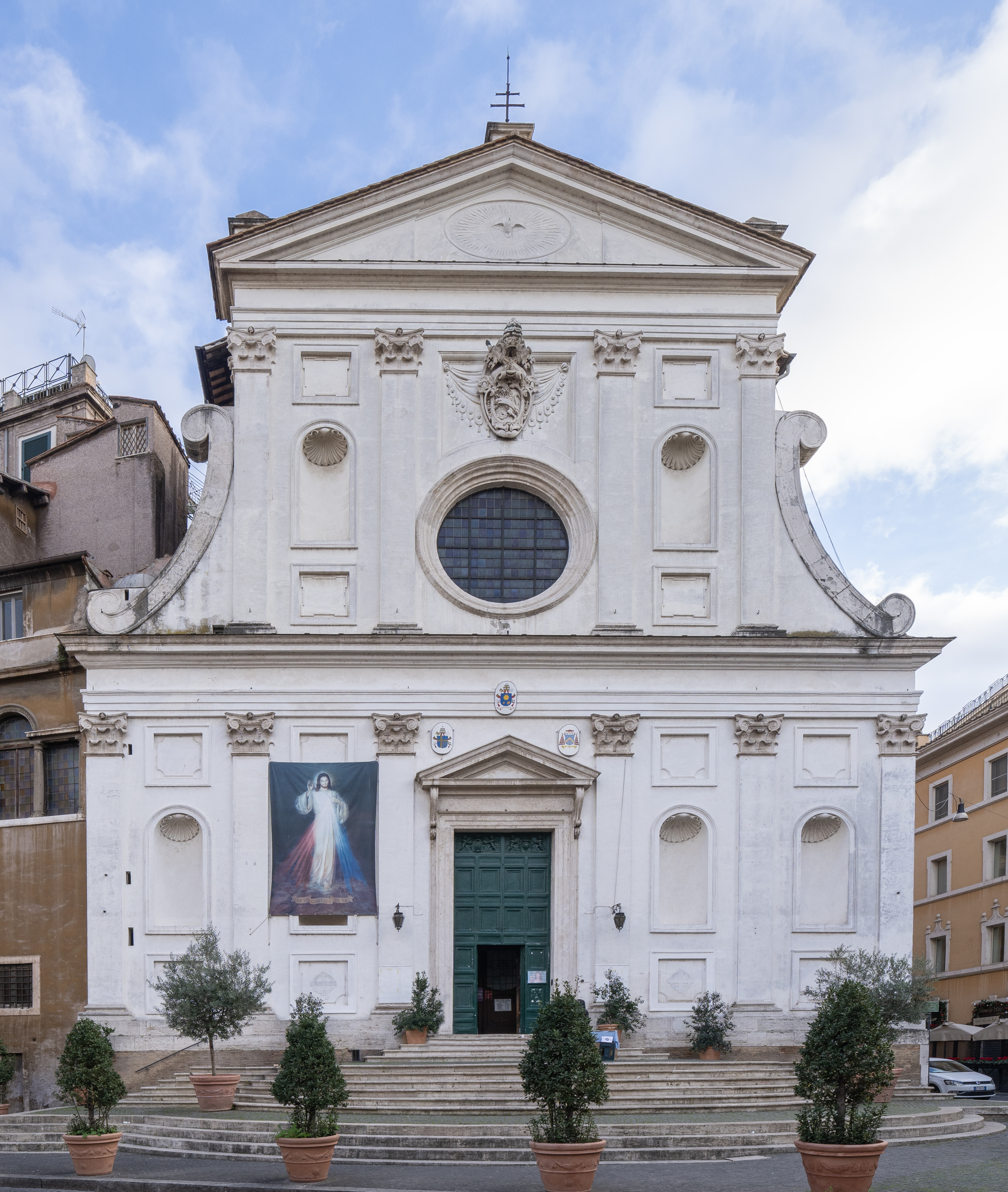
Santo Spirito in Sassia. To the right Via dei Penitenzieri, in the background Porta Santo Spirito by Antonio da Sangallo the Younger

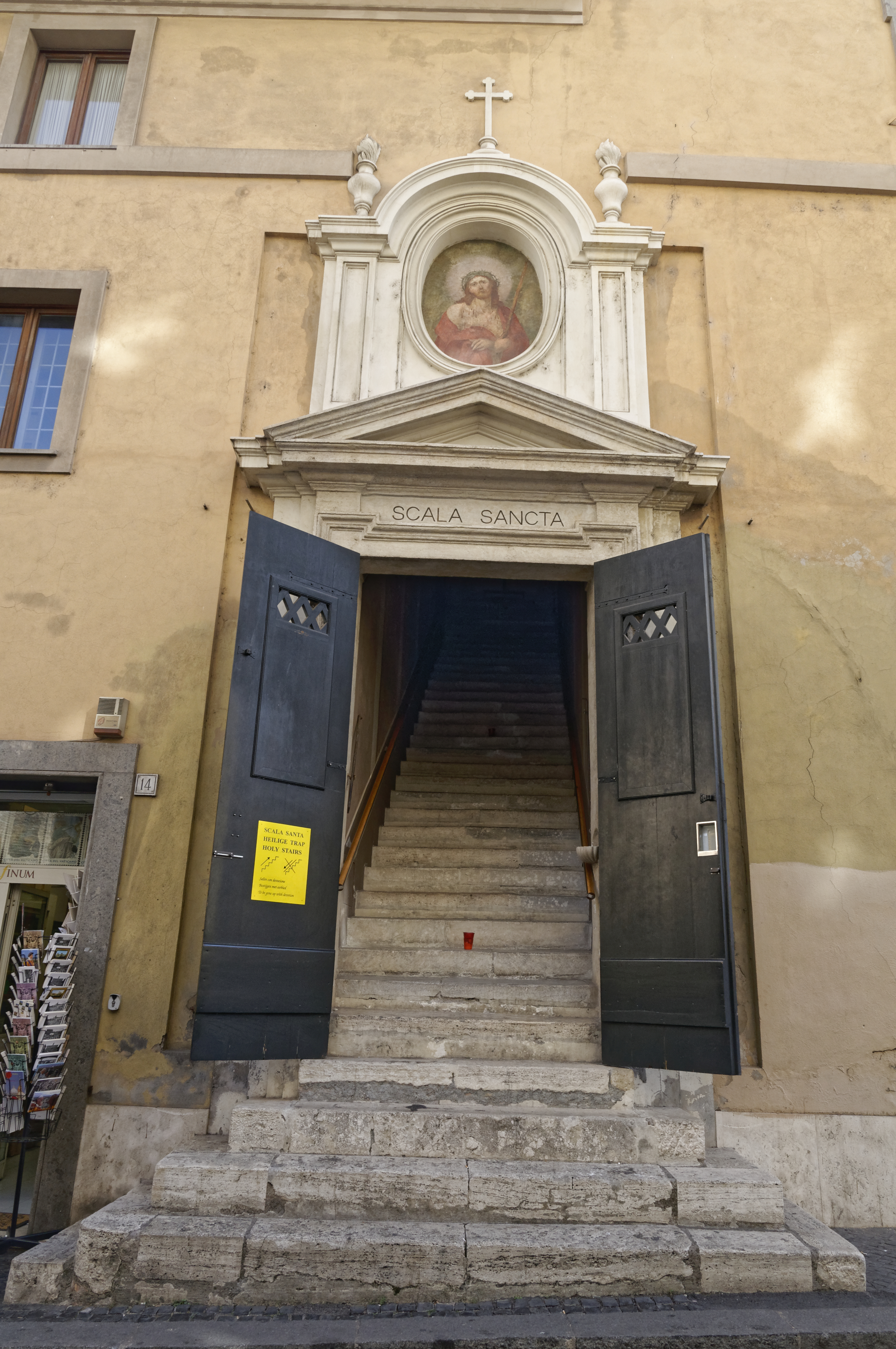
The Scala Santa along Borgo Santo Spirito

Between the hospital and Via dei Penitenzieri in the 15th century lay some houses belonging to the Tomacelli and then to the Migliorati.

The mother of Boniface IX (r. 1389–1404) and Ludovico Migliorati, nephew of Innocent VII (r. 1404–1406), lived there. In the Migliorati palace, Ludovico, on the orders of his uncle, slaughtered the representatives of the Commune of Rome who had come to the pope to ask for guarantees for republican freedom. In this period during solemnities the Veil of Veronica, the most important relic of Christianity, was displayed from a window of the palace. In 1600, this group of houses was demolished to erect the palace of the Commendatore dell'Ospedale, built by order of Gregory XIII (r. 1572–1585) by Nanni di Baccio Bigio.

Borgo Santo Spirito was affected too by the building renewal of the Borgo during the Renaissance. Cause of this was Pope Sixtus IV, who on the occasion of the Jubilee of 1475 had the road straightened and paved. In addition, besides rebuilding the Hospital of Santo Spirito, on the first of January 1474 he issued a papal bull granting many benefits to those who built houses in the Borgo that were at least 7 canne (15 m (49 ft) ca.) high.

At the turn of the 15th and 16th centuries, Palazzo della Rovere was built on the northern side of the street, but its main façade faced Piazza Scossacavalli and Borgo Vecchio. Opposite the western side of this palace, Averando Serristori built the palace that still bears his name during the reign of Pope Pius IV (r. 1559–1565). West of this palace, between 1517 and 1520 Cardinal Francesco Armellini let built his palace, possibly after a project of Giulio Romano or his pupils.

In the late Renaissance, several houses were built on the southern side of the street beyond the hospital. Most of them were demolished between 1923 and 1927 for the construction of the Jesuit Generalate, but a couple still remain today. In 1544 Pope Paul III (r. 1534–1549) had Antonio da Sangallo the Younger elevate and complete the church of Santo Spirito, apart from the façade, which was built under Sixtus V (r. 1585–1590) by Ottavio Mascherino.

In the 16th century, the portal leading to the Scala Santa (one of two in Rome) was erected, which is the stairway that Jesus is said to have climbed after being scourged. It leads to the Church of Saints Michael and Magnus.

== Baroque ==
Between 1742 and 1745, Pietro Passalacqua designed near the Tiber on the north side of the street the oratory of the SS Annunziata, popularly nicknamed the Nunziatina. Beyond the oratory, Pope Pius VI (r. 1775–1799) had the Ospedale di San Carlo built in 1789, a branch of the Santo Spirito. The hospital of Santo Spirito itself was enlarged by Alexander VII (r. 1655–1667) (towards Via dei Penitenzieri) and by Benedict XIV (r. 1740–1758) (along the Tiber). Continuing along the road towards St Peter's on the right-hand side, in 1659 the church of San Lorenzo in Piscibus ("St. Lawrence among the fishes", because of a nearby fish market), founded according to an ancient tradition by Galla of Rome in the second half of the sixth century, was rebuilt by the architect Francesco Massari. The renovation was commissioned by the Dukes of Acquasparta, at that time owners of the adjacent Palazzo Cesi-Armellini. Opposite on the left, on the Palazzolo hill, the church of San Michele e Magno was completely rebuilt under Benedict XIV.

== Modern age ==
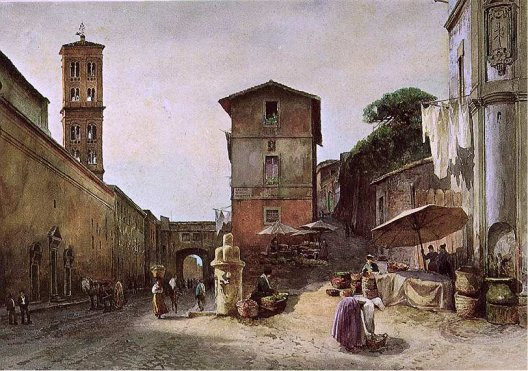
The slope of Villa Cecchini on Borgo Santo Spirito before the demolition of the villa in a watercolour by Ettore Roesler Franz (ca 1880 ).

In 1905, the construction of the Lungotevere Vaticano caused the demolition of the buildings of the Hospital of Santo Spirito adjacent to the river, while the construction of Ponte Vittorio Emanuele II rose the issue of opening a road connecting the Historic Centre to Prati, cutting through the Rione and Borgo Santo Spirito. The solution came in 1936, with the construction of Via della Conciliazione, which profoundly altered the street, although this, unlike the nearby Borgo Vecchio and Borgo Nuovo, both demolished, was spared. Borgo Santo Spirito lost its easternmost stretch (east of the crossing with Via San Pio X), which now follows the numbering of the Lungotevere Vaticano.

The Oratory of the Nunziatina was demolished and rebuilt in a different context along the Lungotevere Vaticano with a modern framework built according to the laws of structural engineering . The construction of Via della Traspontina, the road connecting Ponte Vittorio and the Prati rione (renamed Via San Pio X in its southern section), entailed the demolition of the hospital of San Carlo. Several minor buildings were demolished to allow the reconstruction of Palazzo Alicorni, located between Borgo S. Spirito and St. Peter's Square and destroyed in 1930, while other late-Renaissance houses after the junction with Via dei Penitenzieri were demolished for the construction of the Curia Generalizia dei Gesuiti (the headquarter of the Jesuite order), located on the slopes of the Palazzolo hill. This new building replaced Villa Cecchini, a picturesque building from whose garden one could enjoy a famous view of the Borgo and St. Peter's.

On the north side of the street, the Della Rovere and Serristori palaces were restored, while the Cesi palace was mutilated. The church of San Lorenzo in Piscibus, whose apse faced the street, was brought back to its medieval state and incorporated into the southern propylaeum of Piazza Pio XII. As a result of these transformations, Borgo Santo Spirito, which was already a service road due to the presence of the hospital, lost almost all of its resident population. After the destruction of the nearby roads of Borgo Vecchio and Borgo Nuovo, it remains the only one of the ancient access roads to St Peter's Square that still provides the 'surprise' of discovering the square and the Basilica after having walked along a narrow street in the district.

== Notable buildings and landmarks ==
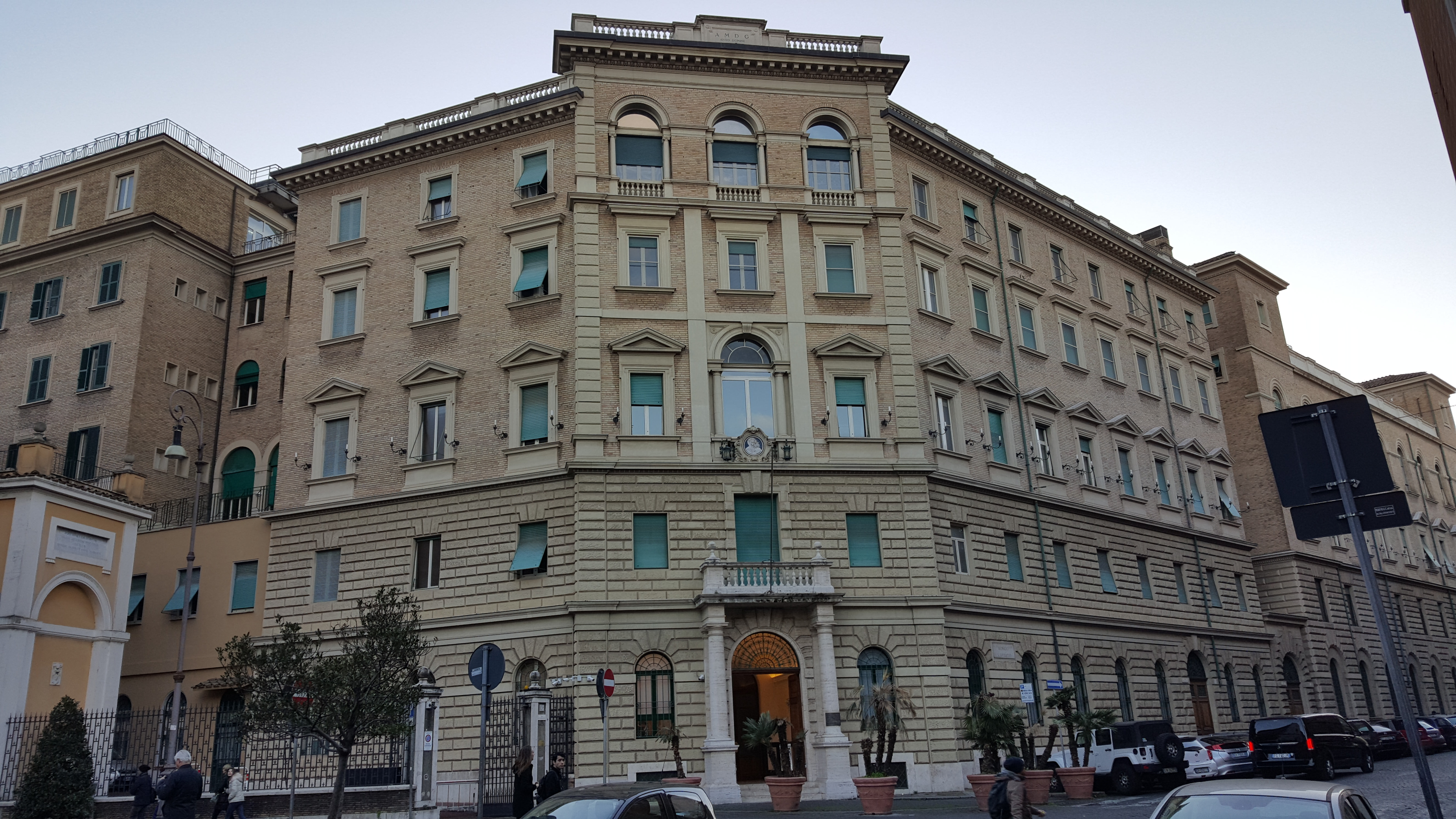
General Curia of the Society of Jesus at Borgo Santo Spirito

- Santa Maria Annunziata in Borgo (demolished and rebuilt)
- Ospedale di Santo Spirito in Sassia
- Ospedale di San Carlo (demolished)
- Palazzo del Commendatore
- Santo Spirito in Sassia
- Curia Generalizia della Compagnia di Gesù (General Curia of the Society of Jesus)
- Palazzo Alicorni (demolished and rebuilt)
- Palazzo dei Penitenzieri
- Palazzo Serristori
- Palazzo Cesi-Armellini (partially demolished)
- Scala Santa
- San Lorenzo in Piscibus (partially demolished)
- Santi Michele e Magno

== Sources ==
- Borgatti, Mariano (1925). Borgo e S. Pietro nel 1300–1600–1925 (in Italian). Roma: Federico Pustet.
- Gnoli, Umberto (1939). Topografia e Toponomastica di Roma medioevale e moderna (in Italian). Roma: Staderini.
- Castagnoli, Ferdinando; Cecchelli, Carlo; Giovannoni, Gustavo; Zocca, Mario (1958). Topografia e urbanistica di Roma (in Italian). Bologna: Cappelli.
- Krautheimer, Richard (1984). Roma: Profilo di una Città, 312-1308 (in Italian). Roma: Edizioni dell'Elefante.
- Delli, Sergio (1988). Le strade di Roma (in Italian). Roma: Newton & Compton.
- Gigli, Laura (1990). Guide rionali di Roma (in Italian). Vol. Borgo (I). Roma: Fratelli Palombi Editori. ISSN 0393-2710.
- Gigli, Laura (1992). Guide rionali di Roma (in Italian). Vol. Borgo (II). Roma: Fratelli Palombi Editori. ISSN 0393-2710.
- Gigli, Laura (1994a). Guide rionali di Roma (in Italian). Vol. Borgo (III). Roma: Fratelli Palombi Editori. ISSN 0393-2710.
- Gigli, Laura (1994b). Guide rionali di Roma (in Italian). Vol. Borgo (IV). Roma: Fratelli Palombi Editori. ISSN 0393-2710.
- Spagnesi, Gianfranco (2003). La Basilica di San Pietro, il Borgo e la Città (in Italian). Milano: Jaca book. ISBN 88-16-40605-4.
- Benevolo, Leonardo (2004). San Pietro e la città di Roma (in Italian). Bari: Laterza. ISBN 8842072362.
- Liverani, Paolo (2016). Claudio Parisi Presicce; Laura Petacco (eds.). Un destino di marginalità:Storia e Topografia dell'Area Vaticana nell'Antichità (in Italian). Rome: Gangemi. ISBN 978-88-492-3320-9.
- Ermini Pani, Letizia; Lepri, Giada (2016). Claudio Parisi Presicce; Laura Petacco (eds.). Il Vaticano dal Pontificato di Simmaco ai progetti di Niccolò V (in Italian). Rome: Gangemi. ISBN 978-88-492-3320-9.
- Cerioni, Anna Maria (2016). Claudio Parisi Presicce; Laura Petacco (eds.). L'assistenza e l'Ospedale di Santo Spirito in Sassia (in Italian). Rome: Gangemi. ISBN 978-88-492-3320-9.
- Valerio, Valentina (2016). Claudio Parisi Presicce; Laura Petacco (eds.). Un Oratorio replicato: la Santissima Annunziata in Borgo (in Italian). Rome: Gangemi. ISBN 978-88-492-3320-9.
