= Ospedale di San Carlo =

Coordinates: 41°54′07″N 12°27′49″E

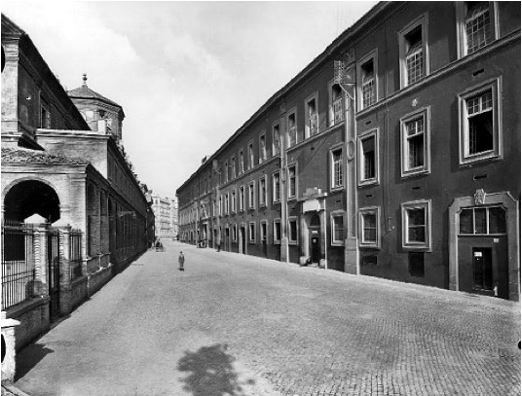
The façade of the Ospedale di San Carlo (on the right) along Borgo Santo Spirito

The Ospedale di San Carlo (lit. 'St. Charles's Hospital') was a building in Rome, important for historical and artistic reasons.

Built at the end of the 18th century by the will of Pope Pius VI, the hospital was initially a branch of the nearby Santo Spirito Hospital. Later it was used as a military hospital for the army of the Papal States and, after the capture of Rome in 1870, became the first Italian military hospital in the new capital. It was demolished in 1939 for the construction of the Via della Conciliazione.

== Location ==
The hospital was in the Borgo rione of Rome, along the north side of Borgo Santo Spirito road, in front of the Arcispedale di Santo Spirito in Saxia. To the west it overlooked the vicolo dell'Ospedale.

== History ==
The building, to the north of the Ospedale di Santo Spirito, was built by the behest of Pope Pius VI (r. 1775–1799) to increase the capacity of the Santo Spirito, which had become insufficient due to the growing Roman population. The construction lasted three and a half years, between November 15, 1788, when the pontiff laid the first stone, and March 1, 1792, when the hospital was inaugurated. The project was designed by the neoclassical architect Francesco Belli, pupil of Giovanni Antinori, who partly reused an existing building. (Note: Gigli (1990), at page 86 mentions as architect Francesco Belli, a pupil of Antinori, and the same does Cerioni (2016) at p. 158, while Collins (2004) mentions as designer Pasquale Belli in the text and Francesco Belli in the caption of the hospital's picture (N. 133) at page 255)

The total cost of the construction amounted to 300,000 scudi, a huge sum for that time. It was destined to host those sick with malaria. The new hospital revealed its usefulness three years after its inauguration, when 1,300 sick people a day were admitted to the Santo Spirito - San Carlo Hospital Complex during the famine that struck Rome in 1795. In the worst period of the famine the two hospitals housed together 17,000 sick people, about 10% of the Roman population of the time.

The hospital, born as a branch of that of Santo Spirito, soon became the hospital of the garrison of the papal army in Rome. Pope Pius IX (r. 1846-1878) had it restored and went there several times to comfort the sick. In 1849, during the Roman Republic, several volunteers wounded during the fights along the Janiculum walls were treated there. Chaplain of the hospital was for a certain period Vincenzo Pallotti. Several prominent medical scholars became directors of this hospital, beginning with Professor Giuseppe Costantini, Papal Archiater under Pius IX. When after 1870 it became the first Italian military hospital in Rome, the hospital was directed by Alessandro Ceccarelli, who later became archiater of Leo XIII (r. 1878-1903), and then among others by Agenore Zeri, Giuseppe Bastianelli, by the physician of Pius XI (r. 1922-1939) Aminta Milani and Alessandro Pianezza. The sick, originally cared for by the Daughters of Charity of Saint Vincent de Paul, were then attended by the Sisters of Charity.

The hospital was demolished in 1939 for the opening of Via della Traspontina, as part of the works for the construction of Via della Conciliazione. The building gave its name to Via dell'Ospedale, a road which still exists today and which marked its western limit.

== Architecture ==
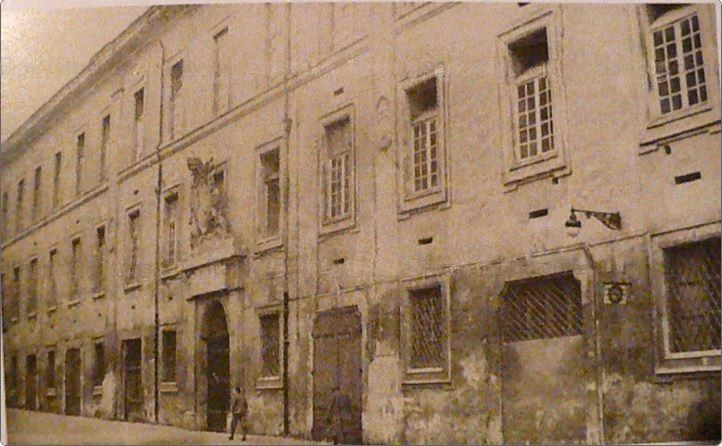
The facade with the main entrance surmounted by the coat of arms of Pope Pius VI

The facade of the building, 137 meters long, was marked by giant order lesenes, a belt course and rectangular windows running along its entire length.

The hospital consisted of a ground floor, which hosted large granaries, and two upper floors: above the main entrance there was a large coat of arms of Pius VI. The patients were housed in two large aisles, both divided in three naves, one on the first and one on the second floor. The lower one, named di Santa Maria (English: St. Mary's), was divided by pillars which supported the vaults, and was 117 m long; the upper one, named di San Carlo (English: St. Charles'), which gave the name to the hospital, was 132 m long and had a wooden ceiling supported by arches which rested on 29 doric columns on each side. In the middle of the aisle there was a large altar, while a second altar dedicated to Joseph Calasanz was placed at the corner with Via dell'Ospedale at the western end of the hospital.

Several architectural elements of the San Carlo aisle, such as portals, inscriptions, and column shafts in peperino with pulvins in travertine, plastered to imitate marble, are preserved in the municipal storerooms.

== Sources ==
- Laura Gigli (1990). Guide rionali di Roma (in Italian). Vol. Borgo (I). Roma: Fratelli Palombi Editori. ISSN 0393-2710.
- Jeffrey Collins (2004). Papacy and Politics in Eighteenth-Century Rome: Pius VI and the Arts. Cambridge: Cambridge University Press. ISBN 0521809436.
- Anna Maria Cerioni (2016). "L'assistenza e l'Ospedale di Santo Spirito in Sassia". In Claudio Parisi Presicce; Laura Petacco (eds.). La Spina: dall'Agro vaticano a via della Conciliazione (in Italian). Roma: Gangemi. ISBN 978-88-492-3320-9.
