= Louis-Albert Lefeuvre =

French sculptor

Louis-Albert Lefeuvre (1845 in Paris – 1924 in Neuilly-sur-Seine) was a French sculptor.

He was a pupil of Auguste Dumont and Alexandre Falguière. From 1875, he exhibited his allegorical works, including Pour la patrie, La Muse des bois.

== Main works ==
- Jeanne d'Arc, statue, plaster, 1875
- L'Adolescence, statue, plaster, 1876
- Saint Michel, Santa Maria Annunziata in Borgo
- Joseph Bara, statue, 1881, Palaiseau
- Après le travail, plaster, 1885
- Armand Carrel, statue, bronze, 1887 (destroyed)
- L'Aïeul, plaster, museum of Cholet
- Le Pain, marble
- Pour la patrie, iron
- Pour la patrie, marble, Salon des artistes français, 1890
- Maréchal Boucicaut
- Paul-Louis Courier
- Marivaux, bust, bronze
- Les Fondeurs de cloche or Les Fondeurs du Moyen-Âge, statue, tin and bronze, Exposition Universelle (1900)
- Le Repos, bronze
