= Rondanini Pietà =

Sculpture by Michelangelo

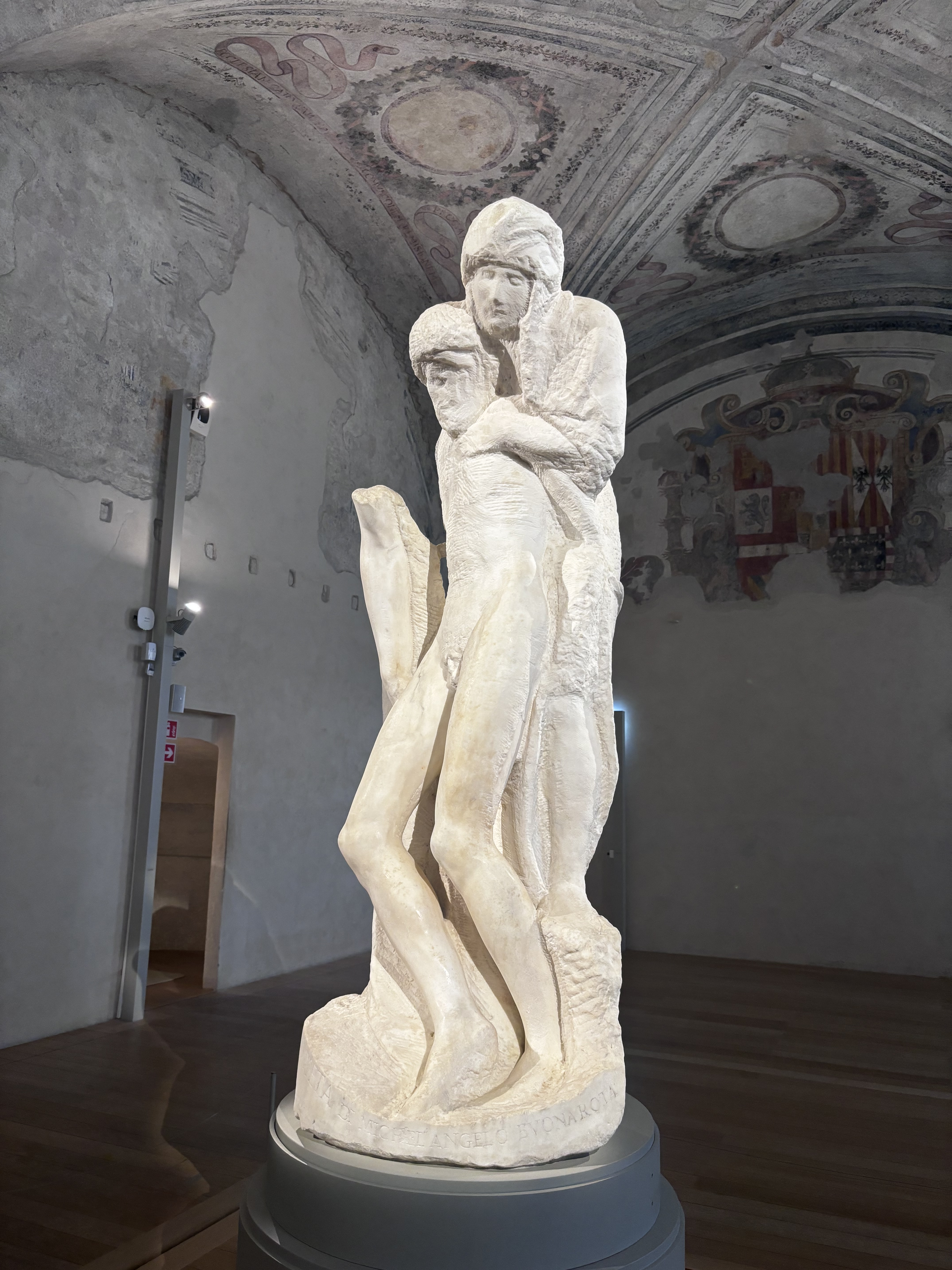
- The sculpture in 2024
- Artist: Michelangelo
- Year: 1564
- Type: Stone
- Dimensions: 195 cm (77 in)
- Location: Castello Sforzesco, Milan
- Preceded by: The Deposition (Michelangelo)
- Followed by: The Entombment (Michelangelo)

The Rondanini Pietà is a marble sculpture that Michelangelo worked on from 1552 until the last days of his life, in 1564. Several sources indicate that there were actually three versions, with this one being the last. The name Rondanini refers to the fact that the sculpture stood for centuries in the courtyard at the Palazzo Rondanini (also known as Palazzo Rondinini) in Rome. Certain sources point out that biographer Giorgio Vasari had referred to this Pietà in 1550, suggesting that the first version may already have been underway at that time. The work is now in the Museo della Pietà Rondanini that was inaugurated in 2015 at Sforza Castle in Milan.

This final sculpture revisited the theme of the Virgin Mary mourning over the emaciated body of the dead Christ, which he had first explored in his Pietà of 1499. Like his late series of drawings of the Crucifixion and the sculpture of the Deposition of Christ intended for his own tomb, it was produced at a time when Michelangelo's sense of his own mortality was growing. He had worked on the sculpture all day, just six days before his death.

The Rondanini Pietà was begun before The Deposition of Christ was completed in 1555. In his dying days, Michelangelo hacked at the marble block until only the dismembered right arm of Christ survived from the sculpture as originally conceived. The elongated Virgin and Christ are a departure from the idealised figures that exemplified the sculptor's earlier style, and have been said to bear more of a resemblance to the attenuated figures of Gothic sculpture than those of the Renaissance. Some also suggest that the elongated figures are reminiscent of the style used in Mannerism.

The unfinished quality of the work fits with Michelangelo's late progress away from naturalism and humanism and toward a mystical Neoplatonism, in which he conceived of a sculpture as latent in the marble and requiring merely the removal of superfluous material; in this manner, he seems to have deprived his human symbols of corporeal quality in an attempt to convey directly a purely spiritual idea.

It has also been suggested that the sculpture should not be considered unfinished, but a work in a continuous process of being made visible by the viewer as he or she moves around to see it from multiple angles.

South African visual artist Marlene Dumas based her 2012 painting Homage to Michelangelo on the Rondanini Pietà.

== See also ==
- List of statues of Jesus
- List of works by Michelangelo
