= Tiberio Calcagni =

Italian sculptor

Tiberio Calcagni (1532–1565) was an Italian sculptor and architect.

He was born in Florence, and accompanied Michelangelo to Rome, and was active about 1570. He completed or attempted to complete a number of his master's works after his death, including his Deposition. Calcagni died young.

== Sources ==
- Boni, Filippo de' (1852). Biografia degli artisti ovvero dizionario della vita e delle opere dei pittori, degli scultori, degli intagliatori, dei tipografi e dei musici di ogni nazione che fiorirono da'tempi più remoti sino á nostri giorni. Seconda Edizione.. Venice; Googlebooks: Presso Andrea Santini e Figlio. p. 167.
