= Lungotevere Vaticano =

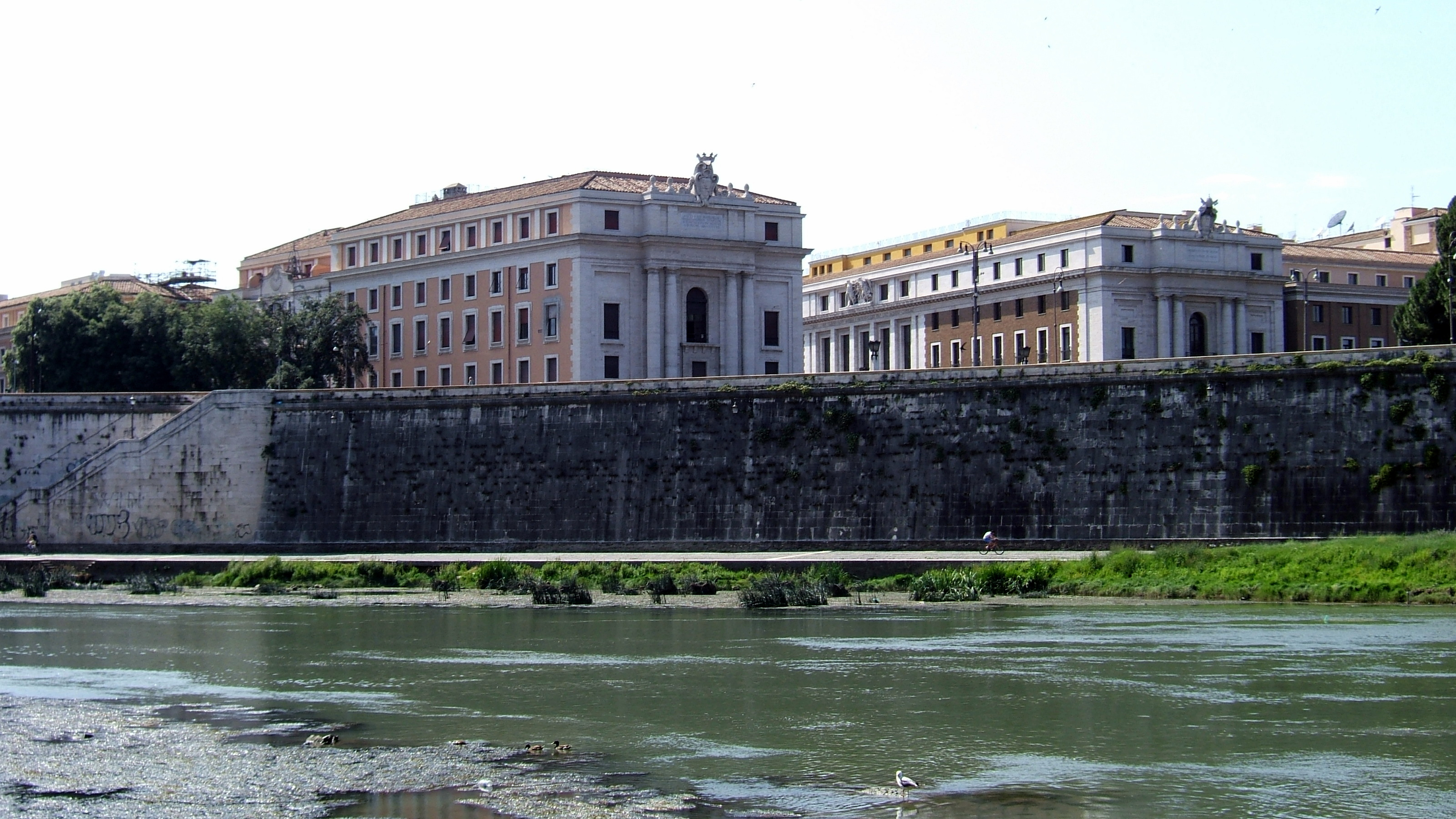
- Interactive map of Lungotevere Vaticano
- Namesake: Vatican Hill (housing St. Peter's Basilica and Vatican City)
- Location: Rome, Italy
- Quarter: Borgo
- From: Ponte Sant'Angelo
- To: Ponte Vittorio Emanuele II

Lungotevere Vaticano is the stretch of Lungotevere that links Ponte Sant'Angelo to Ponte Vittorio Emanuele II, in Rome (Italy), in the rione Borgo.

The Lungotevere takes its name from Vatican Hill, the hill housing St. Peter's Basilica and the Vatican City; it was established as per resolution dated July 20, 1887.

On the Lungotevere lies the Church of Santa Maria Annunziata in Borgo (known as Annunziatina), formerly in Borgo Santo Spirito, then demolished during the construction of Via della Conciliazione and re-built in 1950 at the corner with Via San Pio X. The façade dates back to the 8th century and is attributed to Pietro Passalacqua. Its interior houses works of art from the little church of San Michele Arcangelo al Corridore in Borgo Sant'Angelo, now demolished.

== Bibliography ==
- Rendina, Claudio; Paradisi, Donatella (2004). Le strade di Roma. Third volume P-Z. Rome: Newton Compton Editori. ISBN 88-541-0210-5.
