= Porta Settimiana =

Gate of the Aurelian Walls, a landmark of Rome, Italy

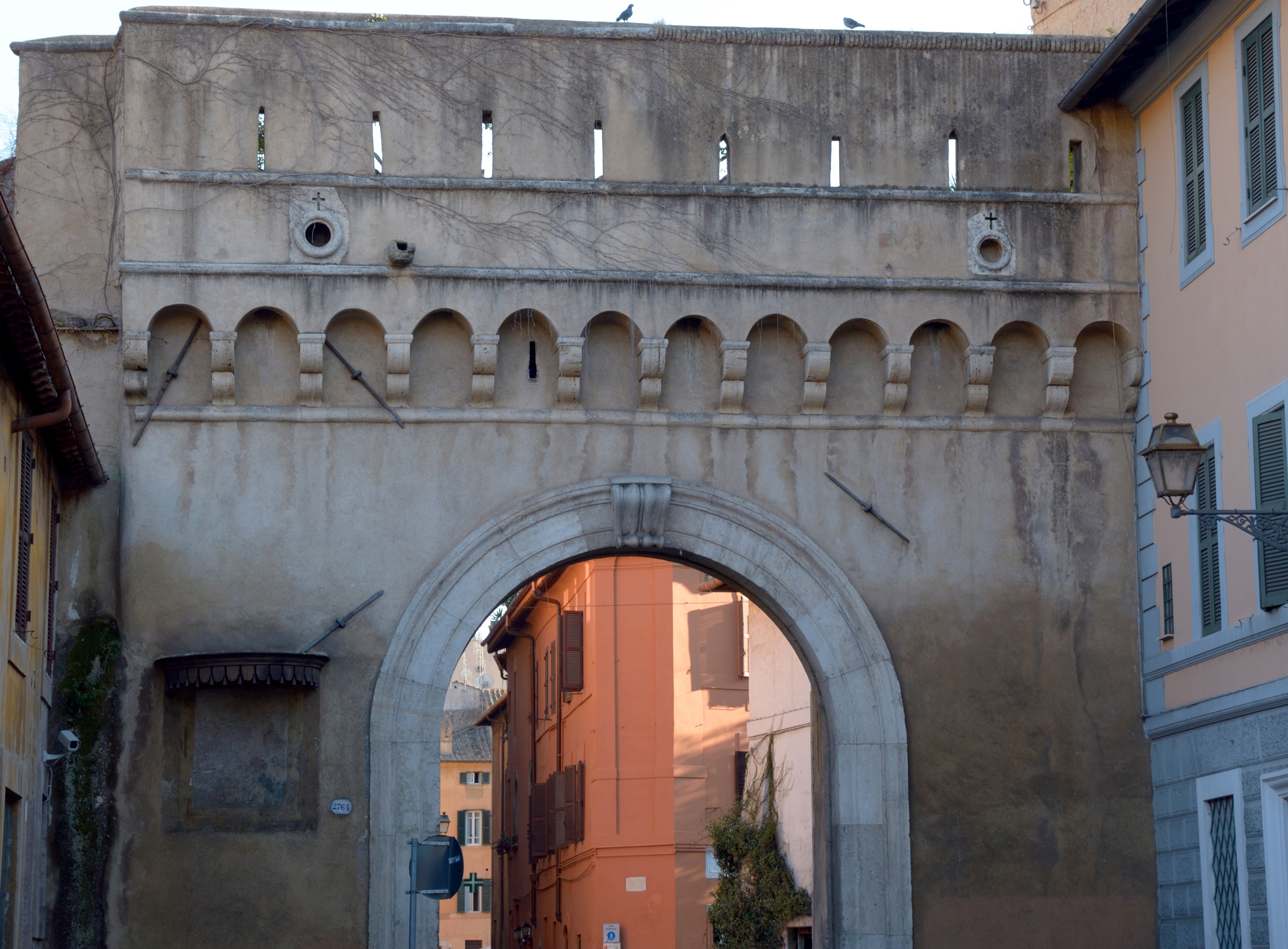
- Porta Settimiana, outer side

- Location within Rome
- Interactive map of Porta Settimiana
- 41°53′31.96″N 12°28′3.4″E
- Location: Rome

Porta Settimiana is one of the gates of the Aurelian Walls in Rome, Italy. It rises at the northern vertex of the rough triangle traced by the town walls, built by Emperor Aurelian in the 3rd century, in the area of Trastevere and up through the Janiculum.

The gate marks the beginning of Via della Lungara and is the only gate, on the right bank of the Tiber (the other ones are Porta Portuensis, no longer extant, and Porta San Pancrazio), that rises just in the place where it was built, despite its restorations and rebuildings.

== Name ==
There are several theories about the meaning of the name. An etymology related to its location north of the Temple of Janus (septentrio and Ianus in Latin) looks plausible. The most recent hypotheses take into account the possibility that the name comes from the proximity to a monument of the age of Septimius Severus: maybe it was an arch of the aqueduct bringing water to the thermal baths dedicated to the Emperor; maybe the entrance of the Horti Getae, the gardens owned by the Emperor's son Publius Septimius Geta, the brother of Caracalla and co-Emperor for few months; maybe a rear gate giving access to the quarter of Trastevere, within walls that had no military importance at that time. In this case, the gate should be dated back to at least 60 years before the building of the Aurelian walls. During the Middle Ages there was a proliferation of legends: according to one of them, Augustus, before becoming Emperor, had raised seven hymns while making a pilgrimage to the Temple of Janus (septem Iano laudes).

== History ==
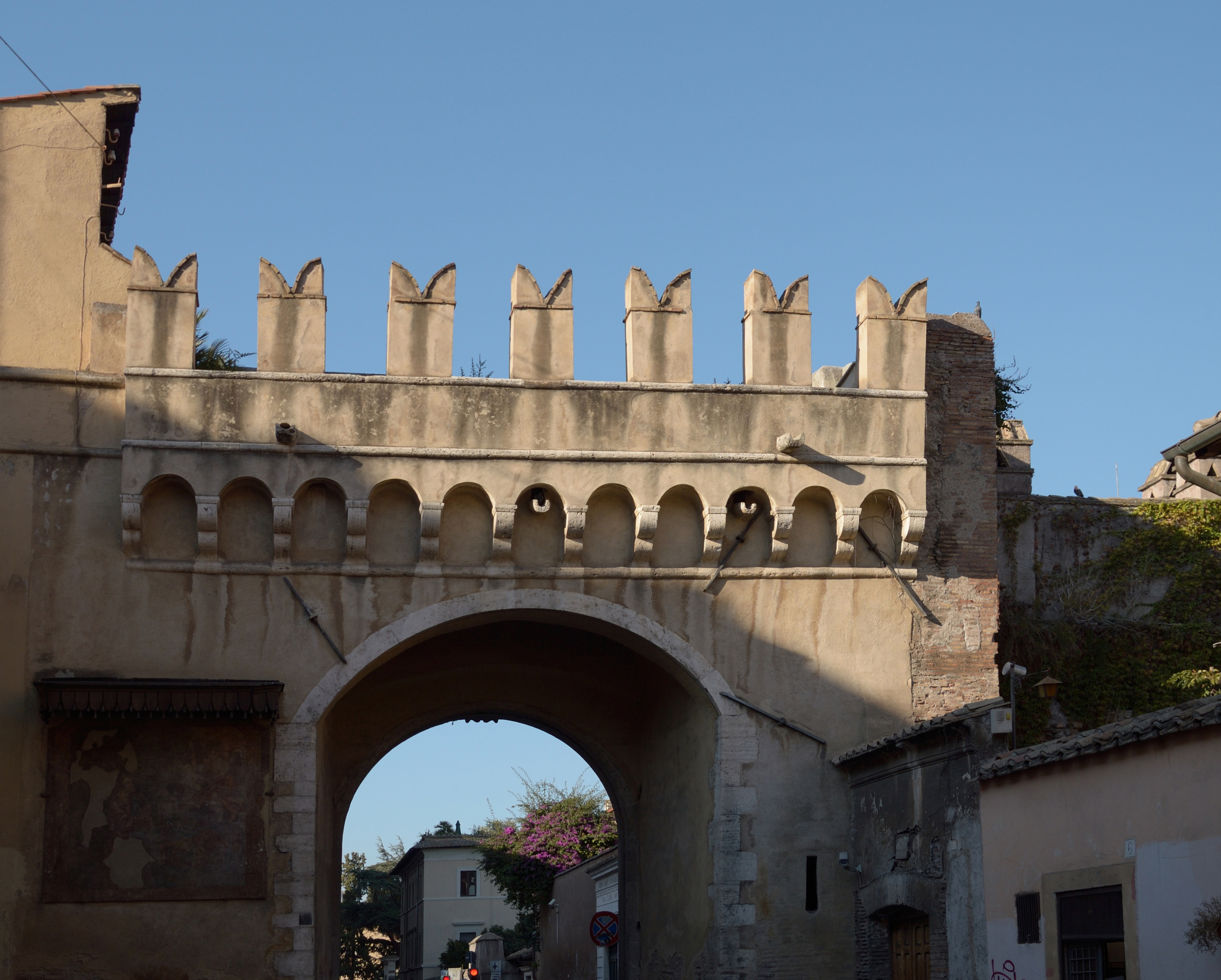
Porta Settimiana, inside view.

A passage of Livy, that nonetheless does not mention the gate explicitly, could indicate that it was built during the monarchy; however, at that time there was no wall on the right bank of the Tiber (the first one was built in 87 BC), but just a fortress protecting Pons Sublicius; therefore the citation appears to be totally unreliable.

No trace or information about the former architectural structure has survived; maybe it just consisted of a postern or so. The gate has been mentioned (but not with certainty) as the meeting point between Lucius Cornelius Cinna and Gaius Marius with his army during the Social War, and no other antique document mentions it up to a document written in 1123.

The important arterial road, running between the river and the Janiculum, started from Porta Settimiana and led to Porta Santo Spirito and then to St. Peter's Basilica (now Via della Lungara), was formerly called Via Santa ("Holy Street"), due to its important role in the access of pilgrims. The street and the gate are mentioned in some documents dating back to the end of the 14th century, disposing to keep both of them clean and free of debris from the flood of the river and to throw no garbage, so that the road was adequate to its name and function. After a restoration by Pope Nicholas V in 1451, in 1498 - due to the remarkable importance that the street had acquired - Pope Alexander VI rebuilt the gate and enlarged it, probably raising it from its former level and giving it the present aspect. On that occasion an inscription, referring to Septimius Severus according to some contemporaries, was lost; it probably was an important clue for the reconstruction of the history of the gate. In 1643, during the building of the Janiculum walls by Pope Urban VIII, almost the entire stretch of Aurelian walls on the right bank of the River was torn down and the gate was included within the new walls, thus losing any military and access function.

The last renovation, carried out by Pope Pius VI in 1798, maintained a military aspect - included with the guelph battlements - scarcely justifiable for a gate fully integrated into a city quarter.

== See also ==
Porta Settimiana, drawing by Giuseppe Vasi (around 1750).

- Porta Tiburtina – Gate of the Aurelian walls, a landmark of Rome, Italy

== Notes ==
Preceded by Porta San Sebastiano	Landmarks of Rome; Porta Settimiana	Succeeded by Porta Tiburtina
