= Villa Abamelek =

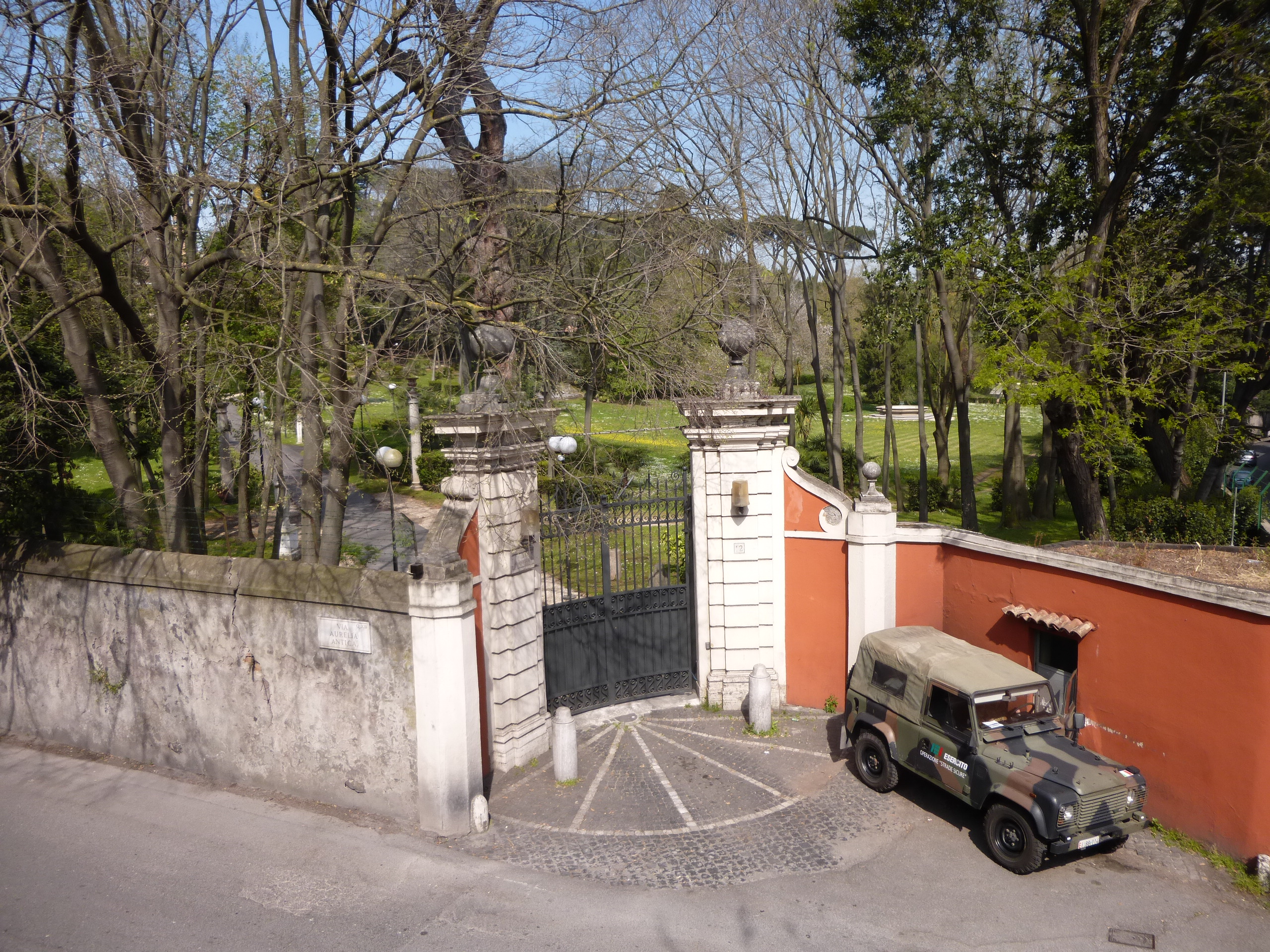
- Main entrance to Villa Abamelek
- Click on the map for a fullscreen view

General information
- Type: villa
- Location: Rome, Italy
- Coordinates: 41°53′32″N 12°27′18″E

Design and construction
- Architect: Vincenzo Moraldi

Villa Abamelek, located near the Janiculum Hill in the immediate vicinity of Porta San Pancrazio, is one of Rome's urban villas. It is the residence of Russian ambassadors. The address of the diplomatic office is Via Aurelia Antica 12.

== History ==
Constructed in the late seventeenth and early eighteenth centuries by the renowned Genoese marquis and banker Paolo Girolamo Torre, the building, now known as Palazzina Belvedere, was originally intended as his private residence in the area between Via Aurelia Antica and Porta Cavalleggeri. The villa was lavishly decorated with an array of frescoes by Giuseppe Passeri, though parts of this cycle have since been lost. In addition, a picture gallery featuring classicist and mythological themes was installed, showcasing works by Giuseppe Bartolomeo Chiari, Benedetto Luti, and other artists from the circle of the Accademia di San Luca.

The villa also played a significant historical role: on August 22, 1700, it hosted a meeting of bishops in preparation for the nearby conclave, which was convened due to the illness of Pope Innocent XII, who would pass away on September 27 that same year. Financial difficulties led the Torre family to sell the villa in 1722 to the Ospedale di Santo Spirito in Sassia. In 1734, the hospital resold the property to Monsignor Giuseppe Maria Feroni, a Florentine nobleman who would soon be elevated to cardinal. Feroni commissioned the Florentine architect Alessandro Galilei to renovate the complex with new furnishings that reflected contemporary tastes; in addition to the classic religious vestments required in clerical homes, the walls were adorned with rich Chinese papers, embracing the emerging vogue for chinoiserie.

From the end of the eighteenth century onward, the villa changed owners several times. In 1792, it passed to Giovanni Torlonia, then to his daughter Countess Maria Teresa Marescotti, and later to the Valentini and Giraud families. The Battle of the Janiculum in 1849, fought between the French army and the troops of the Roman Republic, severely damaged the building, marking a turning point in its history. In 1854, Prince Filippo Doria Pamphili purchased the villa with the eventual plan of annexing it to his nearby residence. Under his direction, architect Andrea Busiri Vici restored the complex and transformed the garden to reflect contemporary landscape tastes. The property was sold to the Ricasoli family in 1863 before eventually coming into the possession of Russian Prince Semyon Abamelek-Lazarev in 1907.

Prince Abamelek-Lazarev, descended from an aristocratic Georgian family of Armenian origin, had built his fortune through banking and the exploitation of salt mines in Russia's Perm region. With the help of architect Vincenzo Moraldi, he gave both the park and the building a new look. By acquiring neighboring vineyards and farmhouses, he expanded the estate and enriched the nineteenth-century landscape garden with a substantial collection of ancient sculptures, including an Etruscan sarcophagus, various statues and busts, as well as seventeenth-century pieces. Additionally, the eighteenth-century casino, known as “Villa Belvedere” in the nineteenth century and now as Palazzina Belvedere, was enlarged with the addition of a new building.

Originally built to serve the vineyards and furnaces, the structure has been transformed into what is now known as the Casino of the Muses or Theater. The interior is richly adorned with paintings—especially works from the Venetian school—along with Venetian furnishings, Flemish tapestries, sculptures from various periods, assorted furniture, and Roman floor mosaics. This grand edifice is a striking example of eclecticism, dedicated to the Muses and the Camenas. It features a spacious hall with a stage, purpose-built as a theater where concerts and performances were held for the prince and his wife, Marija Pavlovna Demidova. Outside, a theatrical hemicycle inspired by Greek theaters and modeled on 17th-century villa theaters—complete with Roman busts—adds to its charm.

After the prince's death in 1916, the villa continued to stand as a testament to eclectic and international patronage, showcasing a blend of artistic styles from various eras. In his will, the prince left the villa to the Imperial Academy of Arts in St. Petersburg. However, the outbreak of the Russian Revolution a few months later halted the donation, as it was clearly not his wish for the property to fall into Bolshevik hands, leading to a complicated legal battle given the lack of legal continuity between the Russian Empire and the Soviet Union.

Even before the princess's death in 1955, after she had relocated to Florence to reside in the Medici villa at Pratolino, the building was still claimed by the Union of Soviet Socialist Republics in 1936. After the end of fascism and World War II, Legislative Decree No. 385 of the Provisional Head of State dated February 28, 1947, officially established the transfer of ownership of the Abamelek-Lazareff villa in Rome to the Soviet State. As a result, the villa became the diplomatic headquarters in Italy for Soviet representatives and, from 1991, for the Russian Federation.

Within the vast twenty-seven-hectare park, foxes, hedgehogs, and other wild animals can be encountered, along with a variety of birds. Additionally, some archaeological remains have been found that allowed for the identification of the barracks of Emperor Nero's personal guard. At the end of the twentieth century, construction began on the Orthodox Church of Saint Catherine of the Martyr, which was completed in 2009.
