= Janiculum walls =

Defensive wall in Rome

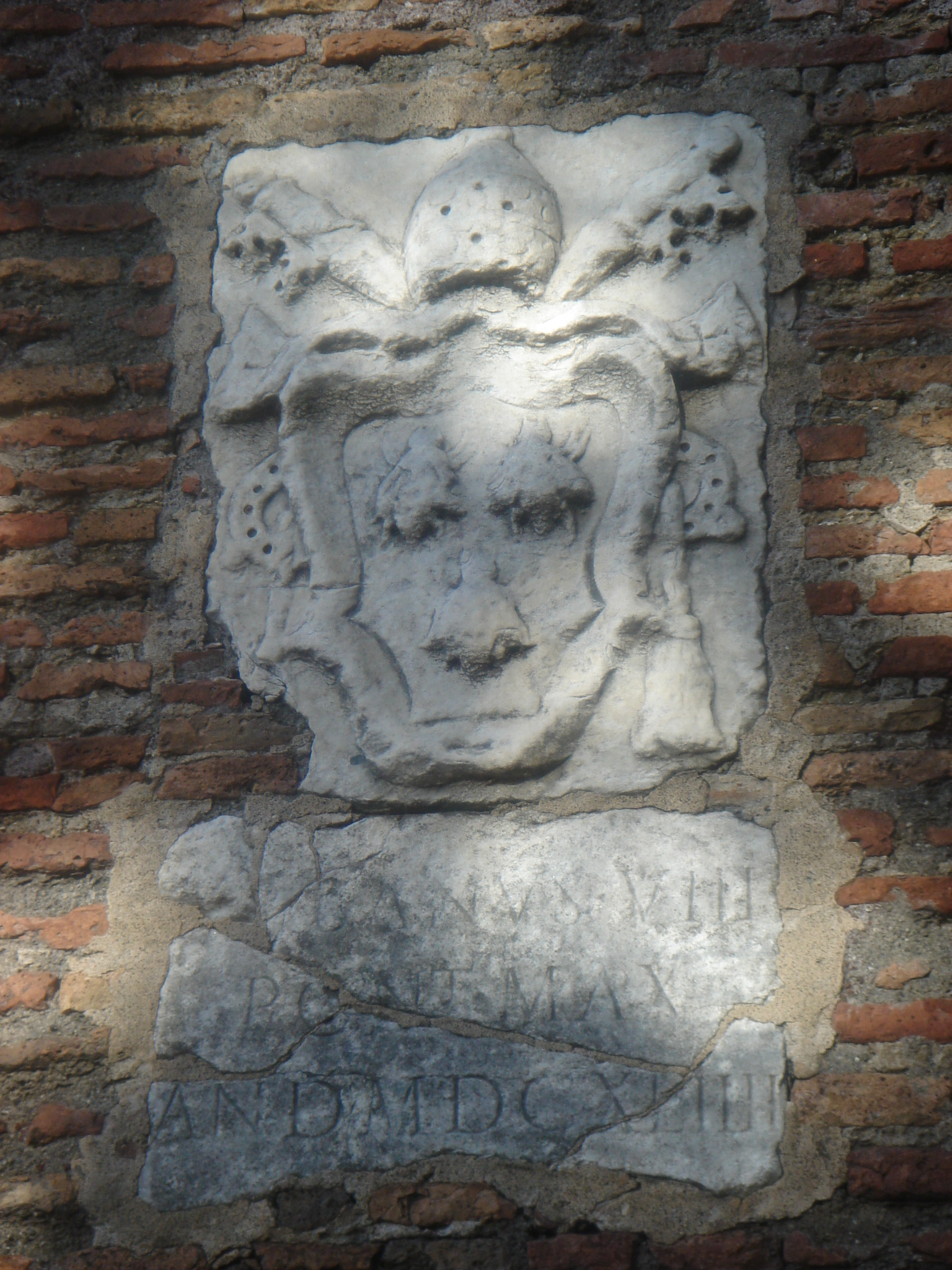
- The coat of arms of Pope Urban VIII along the Janiculum walls

- Location within Rome
- Interactive map of Janiculum walls
- 41°53′08″N 12°27′43″E
- Location: Rome

The Janiculum walls (Italian: Mura gianicolensi) are a stretch of defensive walls erected in 1643 by Pope Urban VIII as a completion of the Leonine wall (defending the Vatican Hill) and for a better protection of the area of Rome rising on the right bank of the Tiber.

== History ==
The need for a fortification, preventing access to Rome through its south-west side, derived from a conflict between two noble Roman families, the Barberini (the house of the Pontiff) and the Farnese, due to economic interests and to the policy of expansion of the former against the latter. The casus belli, cleverly arranged by Urban VIII himself, was the failure to pay to Barberinis the economic rents of the Duchy of Castro and Ronciglione (now in the province of Viterbo), governed by Odoardo I Farnese, the Duke of Parma and Piacenza and supported by Venice, the France of Richelieu and the Grand Duchy of Tuscany.

In the summer of 1641 the Pope himself, leading an army of 15,000 men with artilleries, marched against the Duchy, occupying its territory and the town of Castro: in effect, the economic interests concealed political matters, as well as a kind of feud between rival families, and Urban was waiting for nothing but a pretext to set off the spark.

The "War of Castro", because of the involved powers, could however pose a threat also to the Holy See, the Barberini House and its properties in Rome. The town, though adequately protected, was nevertheless perilously exposed on the side of Janiculum (what's more, too close to the Vatican): on this side, the former wall erected by Emperor Aurelian was no more in condition to guarantee an effective protection.

The work was commissioned to Marcantonio De Rossi, a quite unknown architect, whose appointment was probably thanks to his friendship with the powerful Olimpia Maidalchini. The surveys began in 1641, the building at the end of the following year and in 1643 the work was completed.

The new wall, rising on the west side of Janiculum, had serious consequences on the former defensive structures; in particular, the whole stretch of the Aurelian Walls on that side of the river was demolished, as it rose within the new perimeter. For the same reason, the bastion of the Leonine wall, built by Antonio da Sangallo the Younger close to Porta Santo Spirito, as well as the Porta itself, were by now almost useless; Porta Settimiana became useless as well, while Porta Portuensis, closed 453 m (1,486.2 ft) off the new wall, was demolished together with the Aurelian stretch and replaced with the new Porta Portese northward. The only structure that maintained its function was Porta San Pancrazio, where the new wall almost coincided to the ancient Aurelian structure.

Finally, in the new wall only a gate was built from scratch. Completed in 1644, Porta Portese shows the coat of arms of Pope Innocent X, the successor of Urban VIII, who had died in the meanwhile. From here, with a backward lengthening of the former street, starts the Via Portuensis, that until then sprouted from Porta Portuensis, just south.

Despite the fears of Urban, the wall had to face no serious threat for two centuries, until in 1849 it became one of the main scenes of the fights between the French army of the General Charles Oudinot (helping the Pope, who had lost control over the city) and the militias of the 2nd Roman Republic.

The first tangle, on April 29, 1849, took place at the crossing between ancient and new Via Aurelia; the next day the French troops advanced towards Porta Angelica and Porta Cavalleggeri but, along the whole way up to Porta San Pancrazio, the defenders, sheltered behind the walls, seriously impeded the Frenchmen: the bayonet fitting and then the standoff of the troops led by Giuseppe Garibaldi in the area of the Basilica of San Pancrazio forced the assailants to beat a retreat.

The second fight, in the same area of Villa Pamphilj and Porta San Pancrazio, began during the night between 2 and 3 June. After a battle lasted the whole day, with continuous turn-arounds and a very high death toll on both sides, the Frenchmen gained the upper hand, but the walls held up and the defenders didn't cede.

However, the walls of Urban had been built to resist the 17th-century artillery and, two centuries after, the firepower was quite different: indeed, after making eight breaches in the walls to the left of Porta San Pancrazio and destroying the Porta itself, during the night between 21 and 22 June the Frenchmen overlooked the walls. The desperate standoff in the whole area kept them stuck until 30 June, when the armistice was signed. On 3 July they entered Rome.

The signs of the later reconstruction of the wall are still visible, especially in the stretch that flanks Viale delle Mura Gianicolensi, before the crossing with Via Fratelli Bonnet (but also beyond): Pope Pius IX, as soon as he had strengthened his own position, quickly reconstructed the stretch of wall that had been damaged, as shown by some plates.

The same area on the left of Porta San Pancrazio was the scene of another fight, on September 20, 1870, between the troops of General Nino Bixio and the Papal defenders; but the Bersaglieri entered Porta Pia at the same time, and the Papal troops gave up before the artilleries could destroy the wall again.

== The layout ==
Map of the walls

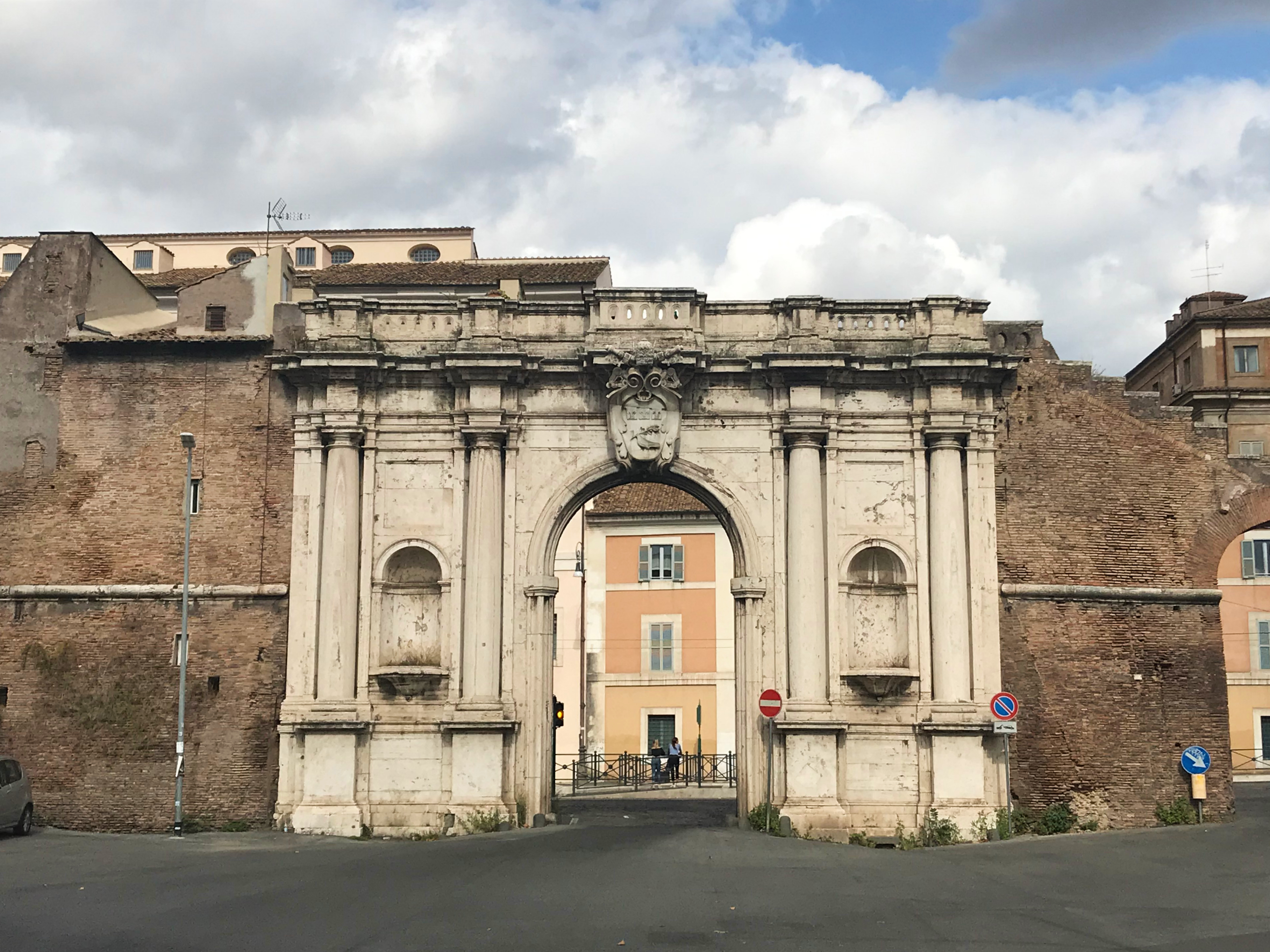
Porta Portese

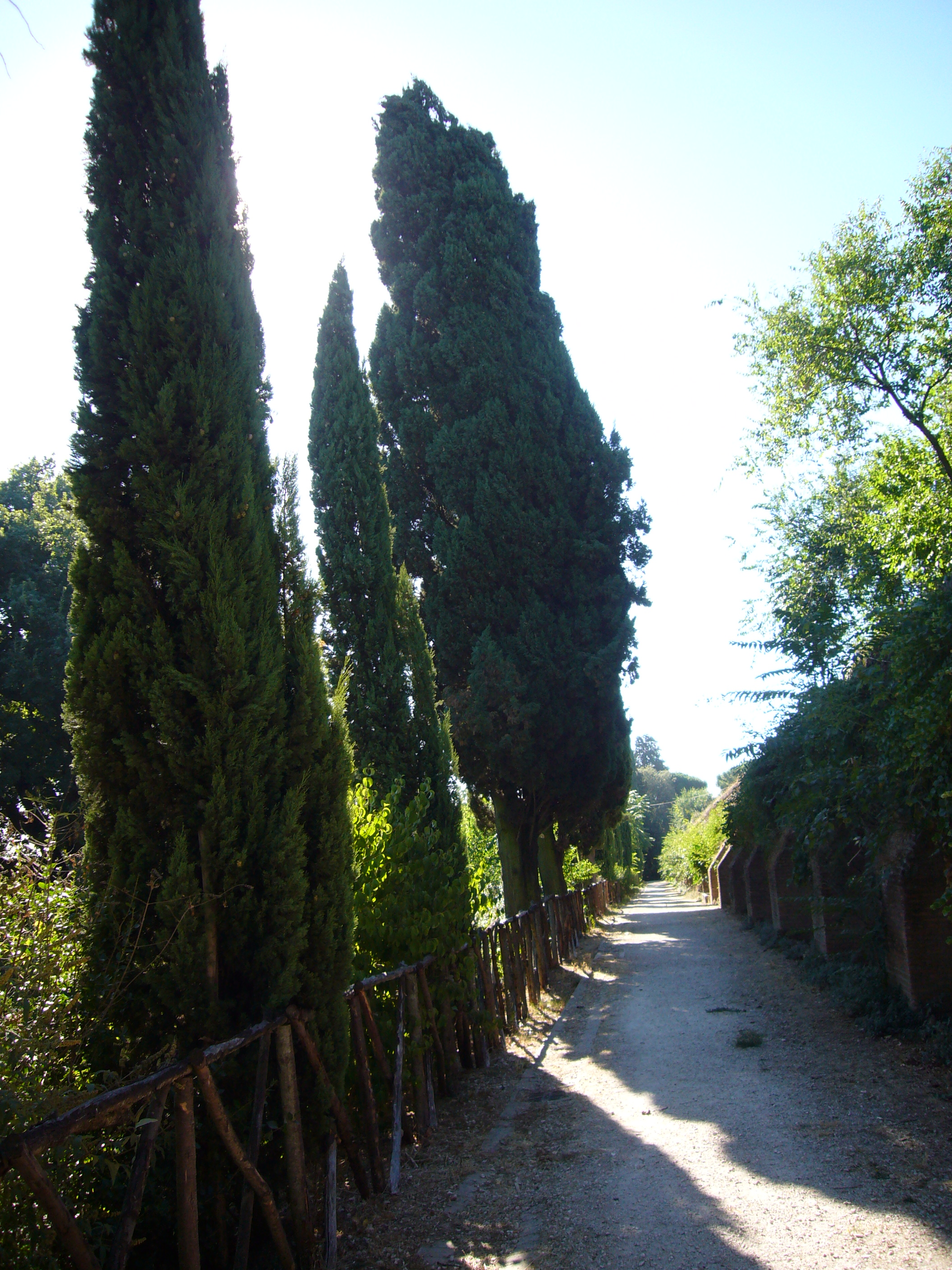
Villa Sciarra: the walk along the walls

The area of Porta Portese, just a few meters from the present Ponte Sublicio, is the lowest of the whole layout: the rise to the Janiculum hill begins soon beyond, partly due to the raising of the ground level. Between the end of the 17th and the beginning of the 18th century, the whole area became the centre of various settlements relevant to river transports: just within the gate rose the Port of Ripa Grande, that was the main dock of the Tiber, in front of the ancient Emporium, while just outside, in 1714, Pope Clement XI built the new “Papal Arsenal”, used for the maintenance of the river commercial fleet of the Pope; the Arsenal operated until the end of the 19th century, when the building of the muraglioni (embankments) of the Tiber interrupted any activity related to the river. The only surviving memory of the Port are two ramps descending to the river.

After a short stretch north-westward, the wall makes a right angle southwest and goes on in a non-linear way flanking Viale delle Mura Portuensi up to Largo Bernardino da Feltre, just where probably it crossed the ancient Aurelian layout. Three coats of arm of Urban VIII are visible along this stretch, where the wall is not particularly high due to the raising of the ground level: they were placed in 1644, when the Pope had already died.

Obviously nothing is left of the bastion that rose where Viale Trastevere - opened during the kingdom of Umberto I - now runs; the wall is again visible, though quite degraded, along the rise of Viale Aurelio Saffi, on the right. In correspondence to the first curve on the left there is a tunnel dug under the wall, used as an air-raid shelter during war period.

The wall goes on climbing and, in correspondence to the last, narrow curve of Viale Saffi, a blind arch is visible, probably used as a tunnel to pass on the other side. After a further, short stretch southward, the wall suddenly turns right, always flanking the street, that now changes its name into Viale delle Mura Gianicolensi.

At the corner there is a quite battered plate, in memory of the works of restoration:

“PIUS IX PONTIFEX MAXIMUS
PROPUGNACULUM
INNOCENTIO X P M EXTRUCTUM
ANGULIS PRORUENTIS LABE[…]
FATISCENS
NOVA MOLITIONE
A FUNDAMENTIS RESTITUTUS IUSSIT
ANNO MDCCCLXI
IOSEPHO FERRARI PREF. AER.”

Next to the plate, a plaque

“S.P.Q.R.
MDCCCXLIX”

remembers the events of 1849. Furthermore, the entire stretch of wall from here up to Porta San Pancrazio is a sequence of signs, more or less visible, of restorations (patchings, traces of subsidences and collapses), that evidently lasted at least until 1861, according to the just mentioned plate of Pope Pius IX.

All along this first stretch, up to the crossing with Via Fratelli Bonnet, the inner side of the wall encircles the area of Villa Sciarra and is only partially visible since, in some places, it is covered by an embankment giving a modern example of the ancient agger, probably similar to the one next to the Servian Wall. About halfway, there is an open postern, serving as a secondary access to Villa Sciarra. Passing through this access gives an idea of the outstanding thickness of the base of the wall.

The stretch, starting soon after the two modern arches on Via Fratelli Bonnet allowing the viability, is the one most damaged by the military events of 1848, commemorated by two plates newly restored, placed just where a sizeable breach was opened. The first plate was placed by the Pope soon after the first restorations and is combined with the three coats of arms of the Odescalchi and Mastai-Ferretti families and of the Municipality of Rome:

“AN. SAL. REP. MDCCCL
AUCTORITATE PII IX PONT. MAX
S.P.Q.R.
MOENIA IANICULENSIA
IN PERDUELLIBUS EX URBE
FRANCORUM VIRTUTE PROFLIGANDIS
QUI FATISCENTIA QUA DIRUTA
INSTAURAVIT REFECIT
VIRO PRINC, PRAES
PIETRO ODESCALCHI
LAURENTIO ALIBRANDI
VINCENTIO PERICOLI
BARTOLOMEO CAPRANICA
JACOBO PALAZZI
ALEXANDRO TAVANI
BARTOLOMEO BELLI
IOANNE BAPT. BENEDETTI
JOSEPHO PULIERI
ALOISIO POLETTI ARCH.
VIII VIRI
URB CUR”

The second plate, that is almost a spite with a totally opposite style, dates back to the period immediately following the fall of the temporal power:

“IV GIUGNO MDCCCLXXI
S.P.Q.R.
DOPO VENTI ANNI
DA CHE L’ESERCITO FRANCESE
ENTRATO PER QUESTE LACERE MURA
TORNO’ I ROMANI
SOTTO IL GOVERNO SACERDOTALE
ROMA LIBERA E RICONGIUNTA ALL’ITALIA
ONORA LA MEMORIA DI COLORO
CHE COMBATTENDO STRENUAMENTE
CADDERO IN DIFESA DELLA PATRIA”

The highest point of the wall is dominated by Porta San Pancrazio, rebuilt in 1854 by the architect Virginio Vespignani (a plate remembers his intervention) in a 19th-century style having nothing to do with the style the gate had before the events of 1849 nor even with the original style of the Aurelian wall. Presently the gate rises isolated in order to ease viability.

The following downhill stretch shows completely different characteristics, as regards both history (it has suffered no damages from bombings and assaults) and landscape (the quite steep slope didn't allow a building growth in the close vicinity). Viale delle Mura Aurelie follows the wall in a quite winding way, according to the profile of the walls and bastions.

After bypassing the first bastion, the wall shows a travertine aedicula, in a quite elevated position, containing a statue of St. Andrew. According to the plate, this is the place where the head of the Saint, held within St. Peter's Basilica since the 15th century, was discovered after being abandoned by the thief that had purloined it:

“ANDREAE APOSTOLO URBIS SOSPITATORI
PIUS IX PONT MAX
HIC UBI CAPUT EIUS FURTO ABLATUM REPERIT
MONUMENTUM REI AUSPICATISS. DEDIC. AN. MDCCCXLVII”

The wall of Urban VIII ends about 1 km beyond, joining the bastion erected by Pope Pius V in 1568 in the area of the present Palazzo di Propaganda Fide, just before Largo di Porta Cavalleggeri. All along this last stretch - not particularly interesting anyway - 12 coats of arms of Urban VIII and 3 of Pius IX are scattered; in the section corresponding to the square that houses the monument to Giuseppe Garibaldi there is a walled-in and quite recessed postern; a plate in remembrance of the restoration works carried up in 1849 in the area of Porta San Pancrazio and two further plates in remembrance of as many further restorations by Pius IX; the first one, dated 1857, is not easily readable:

"PROVIDENTIA PII IX PONT MAX
URBIS MOENIA
A PORTA NOVA PANCRATII HIEROMARTYRIS
AD PORTAM PETRI APOSTOLI PRINCIPIS
MONTIS IMPENDENTIS ALTITUDINE
AC TEMPORIS INIURIA FATISCENTIA
JOSEPHUS FERRARI ANTIST. URB. PRAEF. AERAR.
INSTAURANDA RETICIENDAQUE CURAVIT
AN. CHR. MDCCCLVII”.

The second one, dated 1870, is probably the last artifact of this kind dating back to the age of the temporal power:

“PIUS IX PONT. MAX
MURI URBANIANI PARTEM
QUAM LABES COLLIS SUBSIDENTIS
EVERTERAT
A. FUND. REFECIT
ANNO CHR. MDCCCLXX
JOSEPHUS FERRARIO ANTIST. URB. PRAEF. AER.”

== Bibliography ==
- Mauro Quercioli, “Le mura e le porte di Roma”, Newton & Compton, Rome, 1982

Preceded by Castra Praetoria	Landmarks of Rome; Janiculum walls	Succeeded by Servian Wall
