= Via dei Volsci =

Roman street

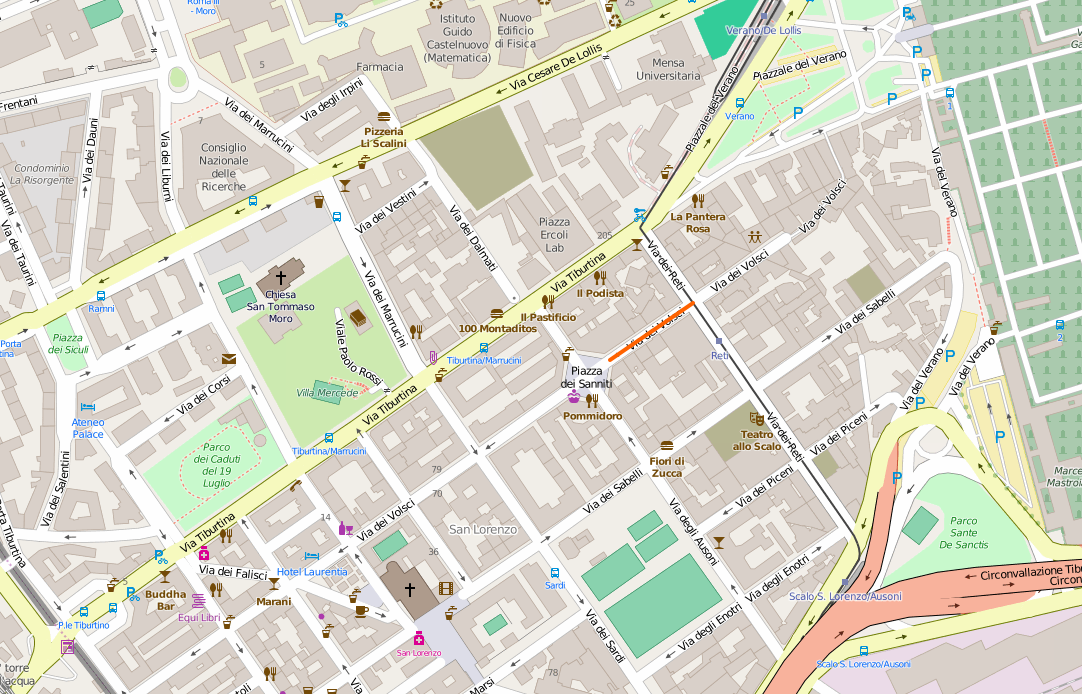
OpenStreetMap of Via dei Volsci and Via Tiburtina

Via dei Volsci is a street in Rome located in the Quartiere San Lorenzo. It is to the south and runs parallel to Via Tiburtina. It also links Porta Tiburtina with the Campo Verano cemetery.

== Left Wing history ==
The street has long had a reputation for being a centre for left-wing agitation and organisation. It gave its name to I Volsci the autonomist magazine.

- No. 32 Headquarters of the Rome section of Autonomia Operaia in the 1970s. It is currently a social centre.
- No. 56 Radio Onda Rossa started broadcasting from here in 1977.
