= Castra Praetoria =

Barracks of the Praetorian Guard in Rome

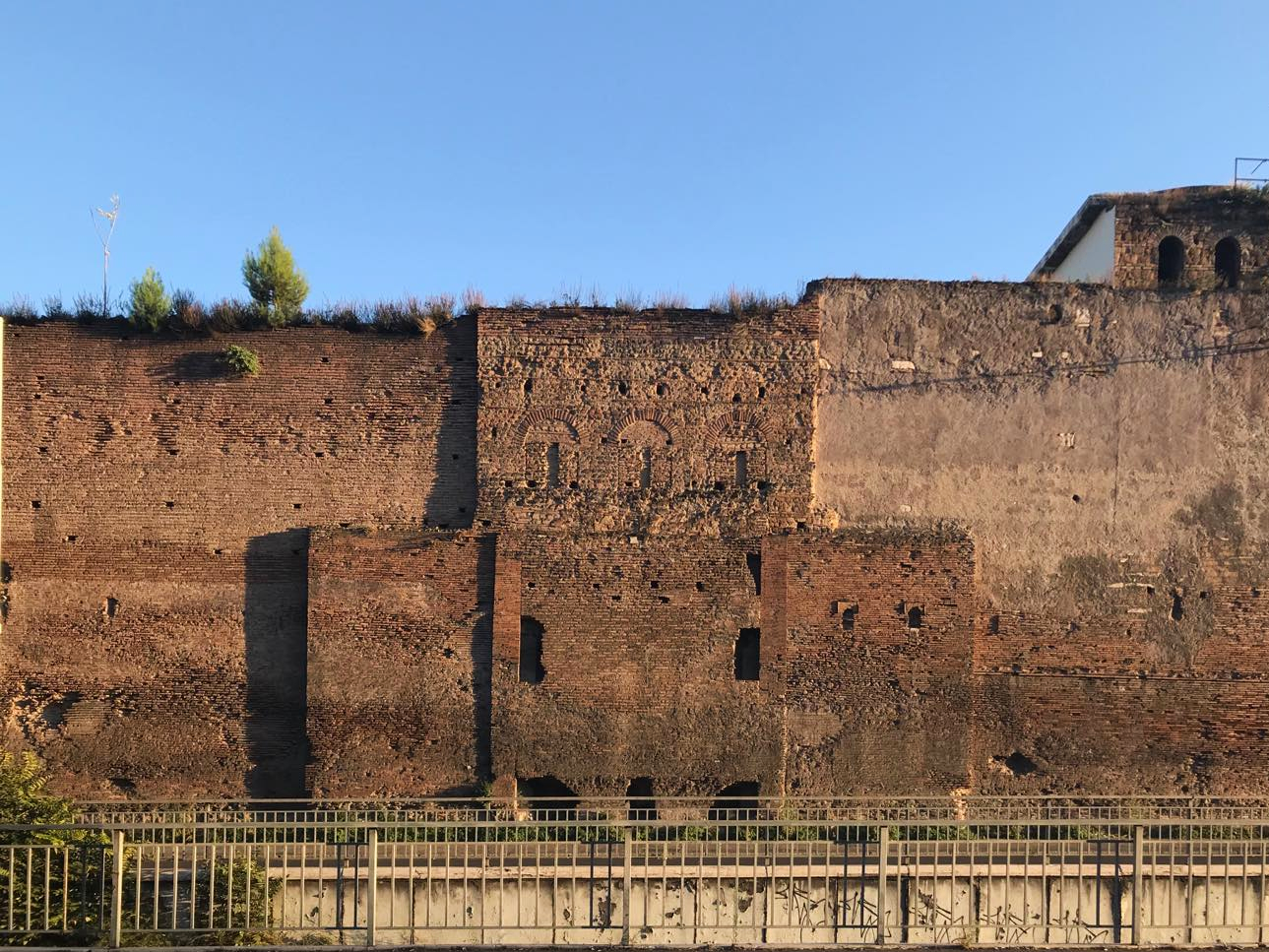
- Remains of the Praetorian Gate

- Location within Rome
- Interactive map of Castra Praetoria
- 41.9059°N 12.5060°E
- Location: Rome

Castra Praetoria were the ancient barracks (castra) of the Praetorian Guard of Imperial Rome.

== History ==
According to the Roman historian Tacitus, the barracks were built in 23 AD by Lucius Aelius Sejanus, the praetorian prefect serving under the emperor Tiberius, in an effort to consolidate the several divisions of the guards.

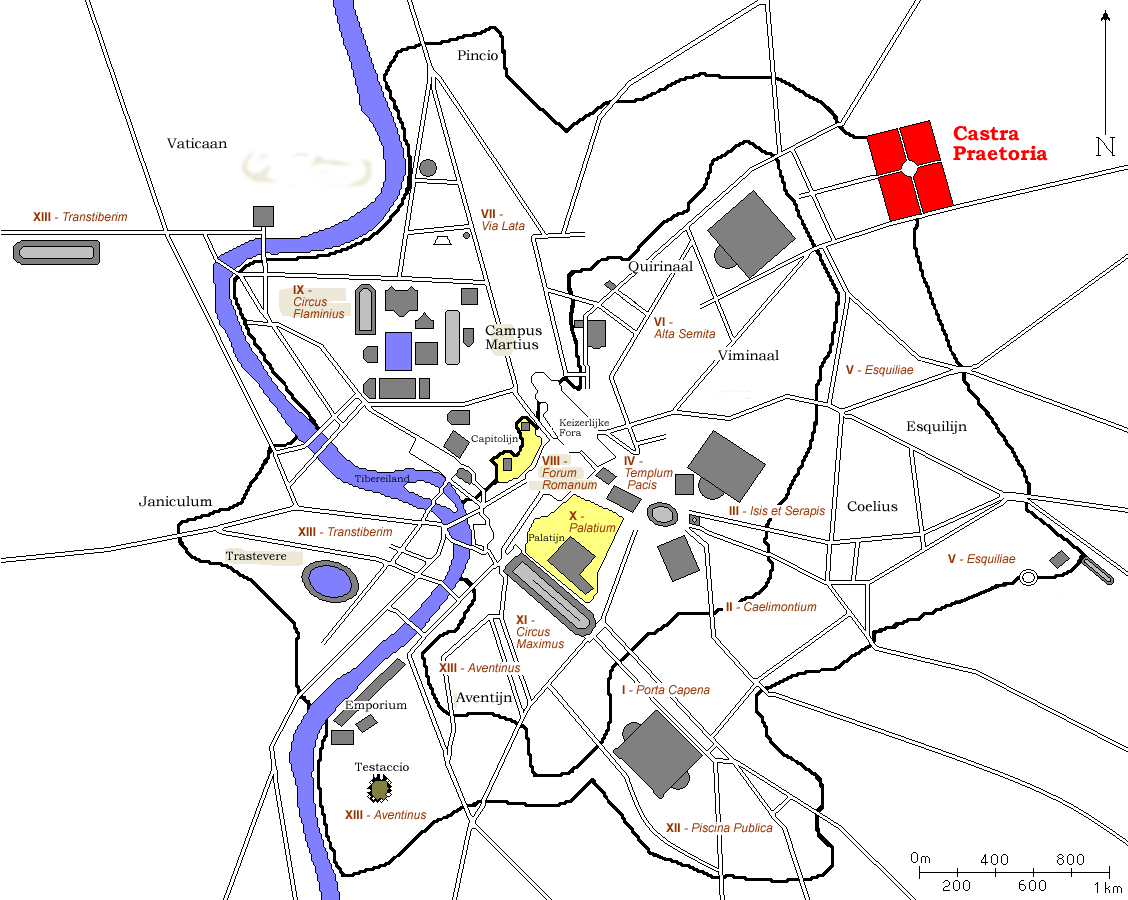
The Castra Praetoria and ancient Rome

The barracks were erected just outside the city of Rome and surrounded by solid masonry walls, measuring a total of 440 by 380 metres (1,440 ft × 1,250 ft). Three of the four sides of the walls were later incorporated into the Aurelian Walls, and parts of them are clearly visible today. The adjacent city district Castro Pretorio is named after the barracks.

The Castra Praetoria was the location of several important events in the history of Rome. It was to this camp that Claudius was brought after the murder of his nephew Caligula to become the first emperor to be proclaimed by the Praetorians. Here, too, was where the Praetorian Guard auctioned off the imperial title after their murder of the emperor Pertinax. On March 28, 193 AD Titus Flavius Claudius Sulpicianus was within the barracks trying to calm the troops when he began to offer a donative if they would support his candidacy for the throne. Meanwhile, Didius Julianus also arrived at the camp, and since his entrance was barred, shouted out offers to the guard. After hours of bidding, Sulpicianus promised 20,000 sesterces to every soldier; Julianus, fearing that Sulpicianus would gain the throne, then offered 25,000. The guards closed with the offer of Julianus, threw open the gates of the camp, and proclaimed him emperor. This was also the site of the slaying of the Emperor Elagabalus, and his mother Julia Soaemias by the Praetorians in 222 AD. Then in 238 AD, the barracks were attacked by the citizens of Rome who were in revolt against the emperor Maximinus Thrax.

The Castra Praetoria was destroyed by Constantine I, who also disbanded the Praetorian Guard upon his conquest of Italy while Maxentius ruled as the Western Roman Emperor in Italy. Their last stand was at the Battle of the Milvian Bridge in 312 AD, and after Constantine's victory he officially disbanded the Praetorian Guard, sending them out to different corners of the empire.

== See also ==
- List of ancient monuments in Rome

Preceded by Porta Santo Spirito	Landmarks of Rome; Castra Praetoria	Succeeded by Janiculum walls
