= Santi Maria e Gallicano =

Church building in Rome, Italy

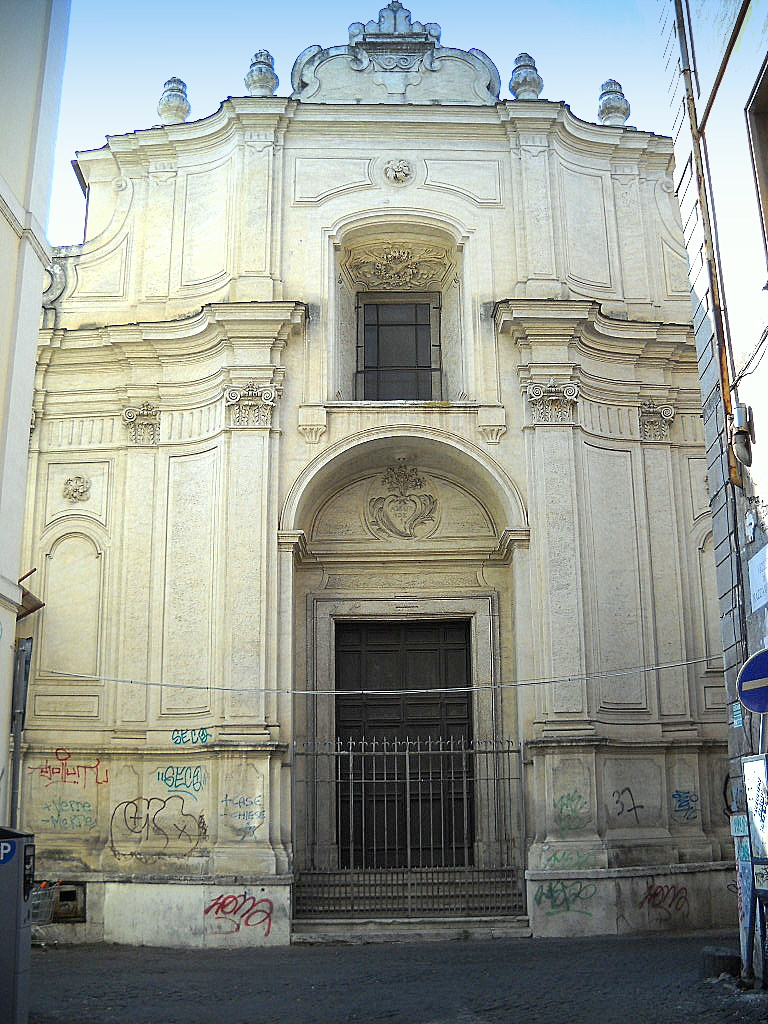
- Façade of the church

Religion
- Affiliation: Roman Catholic
- Province: Rome

Location
- Location: Rome, Italy
- Interactive map of Santi Maria e Gallicano

Architecture
- Type: Church
- Groundbreaking: 1726
- Completed: 1729

Santi Maria e Gallicano is a Roman Catholic church in Rome, in the district of Trastevere, along via di S. Gallicano, 2.

This is the church attached to the hospital with the same name, built between 1726 at 1729 by Benedict XIII through architect Filippo Raguzzini, who also designed the hospital, built for treating those with skin disease.

A plaque outside commemorates a 1925 restoration, while an inscription above the portal commemorates the hospital. The interior is a Greek cross with four apses. There are paintings by Marco Benefial.

Catholic liturgy does not occur inside.The church is no longer listed by the Diocese.
