= I Volsci =

Issue 5, July 1978

I Volsci was an Italian Autonomist monthly journal published in Rome. It first appeared in January 1978.

== Name and iconography ==
The Via Volsci Collectives had been active since 1972, taking their name from Via Volsci, the road in which they were based. The constituted the Autonomia Operaia committee of Rome. During 1977 they were subjected to significant repression, the whole street being shut down by the authorities. In 1978, they adopted the name for their monthly journal. The Volsci were one of the Italic tribes who lived in the area when Rome was founded. There was subsequently a series of Roman–Volscian wars from 495 BCE until their final defeat in the Second Latin War (340–338 BCE). The journal retained this imagery of resistance to ancient Rome, through the use of an image of Obelix, the character in the French comic book series Asterix, on its masthead.
