= Radio Onda Rossa =

Community radio station in Rome

- Rome; Italy
- Broadcast area: Provinces of Rome, Terni and Perugia
- Frequencies: FM: 87.9 MHz (Rome); DAB in the provinces of Rome, Terni and Perugia
- Branding: Onda Rossa

Programming
- Language: Italian
- Format: Free-form; Progressive

Ownership
- Owner: self-managed, Cooperativa Laboratorio 2001

History
- First air date: 1977

Technical information
- Licensing authority: Ministry of Enterprises and Made in Italy

Links
- Webcast: Listen live
- Website: www.ondarossa.info

Radio Onda Rossa is an independent, self-managed, listener-supported community radio station in Rome. It broadcasts daily press reviews, in-depth programmes, interviews, open microphones both produced by and featuring people directly participating in local collectives and committees, social movements, rank-and-file and grassroots unions.

Founded by people who had been for years involved in some of the autonomist collectives historically bound to the neighborhood of San Lorenzo, it quickly became one of the leading "free" radio stations of the '77 Movement. It rejected, though, this label; instead, it defined itself as "militant", "revolutionary", or "the movement's radio".

== Bibliography ==
- Betta, Emmanuel (2014). "Archiviare fonti multimediali nell'età digitale: un progetto online per Radio Onda Rossa" (PDF). Zapruder. Storie In Movimento (May–August). Rome: Odradek: 102–107.
- Corasaniti, Salvatore (2018). Quando parla Onda Rossa. I Comitati autonomi operai e l'emittente romana alla fine degli anni settanta (1977-80) (PhD thesis). Sapienza Università di Roma.
- Padovani, Cinzia (2011), "Free Radio Movement (Italy)", in Downing, John D. H. (ed.), Encyclopedia of social movement media, Thousand Oaks, Calif.: SAGE Publications, pp. 205–207, ISBN 978-0-7619-2688-7
