= San Lorenzo (Rome) =

Urban zone of Rome, Italy

- Zone
- Location: Rome, Italy
- Interactive map of San Lorenzo
- Coordinates: 41°53′50″N 12°30′57″E

San Lorenzo is an urban zone in Rome, Italy. Administratively, it was part of both Municipio II and Quarter VI Tiburtino.

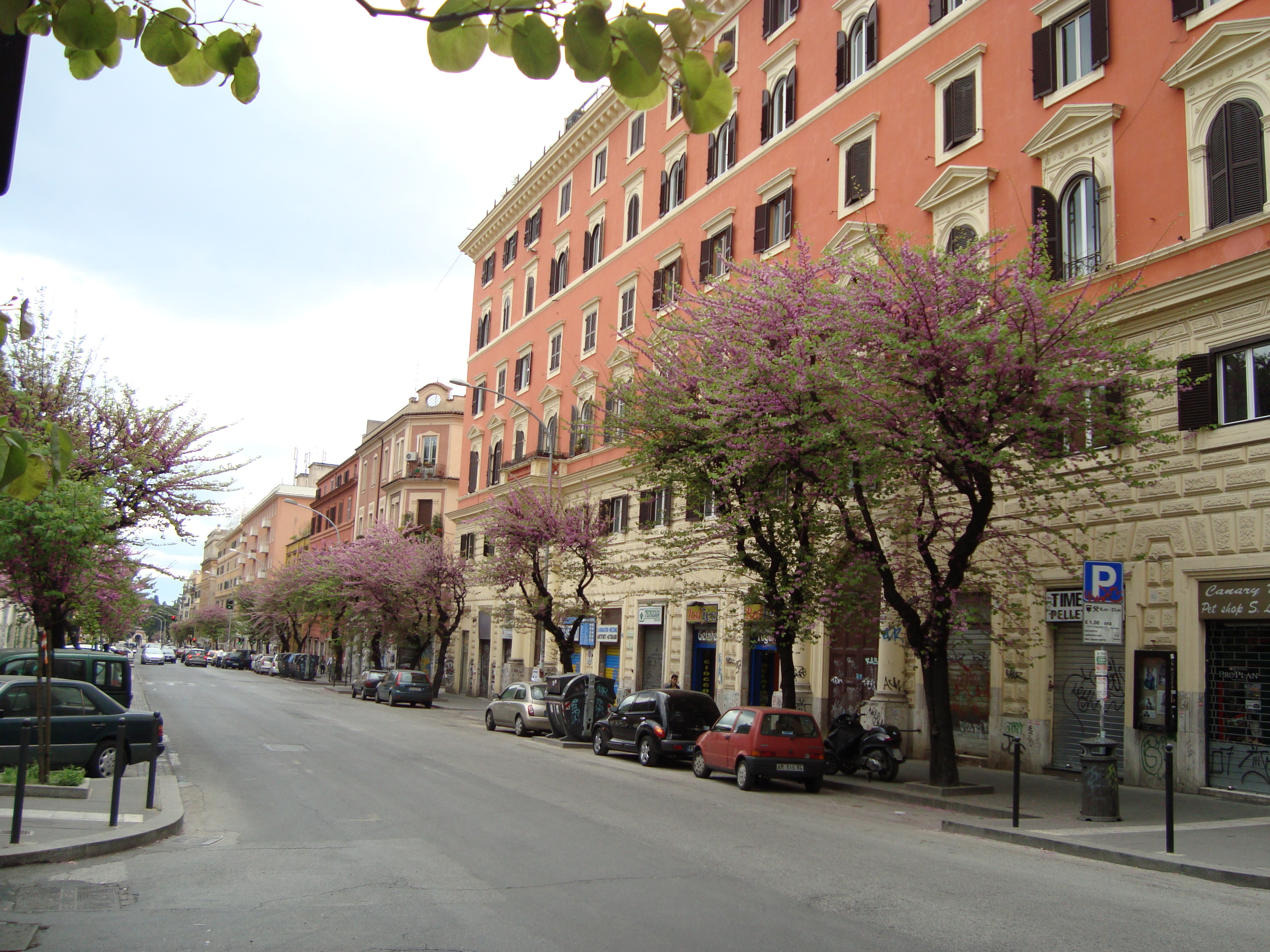
San Lorenzo

It occupies roughly both sides of the early stretch of Via Tiburtina, starting from Termini railway station and ending at the Verano area. The latter includes the ancient basilica of San Lorenzo fuori le Mura, from which the district takes its name.

Originally a working-class neighbourhood (its inhabitants were mostly workers of the Wuehrer Brewery and the freight yard), it has been a popular, left-oriented area. During World War II San Lorenzo was heavily bombed by Allied planes (on 1943-07-19); the only massive bombing of Rome during the war (though not the only air raid on the city), it aimed at disrupting the railway communication pivoting on the nearby huge freight yard; however, it also caused extensive damage to the buildings of the district (including the Policlinico Umberto I and the basilica itself) and killed some 1,500 people.

Maria Montessori's first school (for pupils ages 3-6) was started in San Lorenzo in 1907 under the name "La casa dei bambini". It is still an active, publicly funded nursery, now called "Istituto Comprensivo Maria Montessori".

Today, San Lorenzo, due to its proximity to the La Sapienza University, is increasingly becoming a student and young-artist district. Pizzerias, bookshops, boutiques and other modern places are subsequently replacing the old popular workshops and small markets. The area has many bars, cafes, restaurants, and nightclubs, which also host cultural discussions and art exhibitions.

== In popular culture ==
- Italian singer-songwriter Francesco De Gregori released in 1982 a song dedicated to the 1943 bombing. It appears on the Titanic album (1982).
- It is the setting of Elsa Morante's novel History.

== See also ==
- San Lorenzo fuori le Mura
- Via Tiburtina
- Via Volsci
- Porta Tiburtina
- Campo Verano, cemetery
