= Porta Santo Spirito =

Gate of the Leonine walls in Rome, Italy

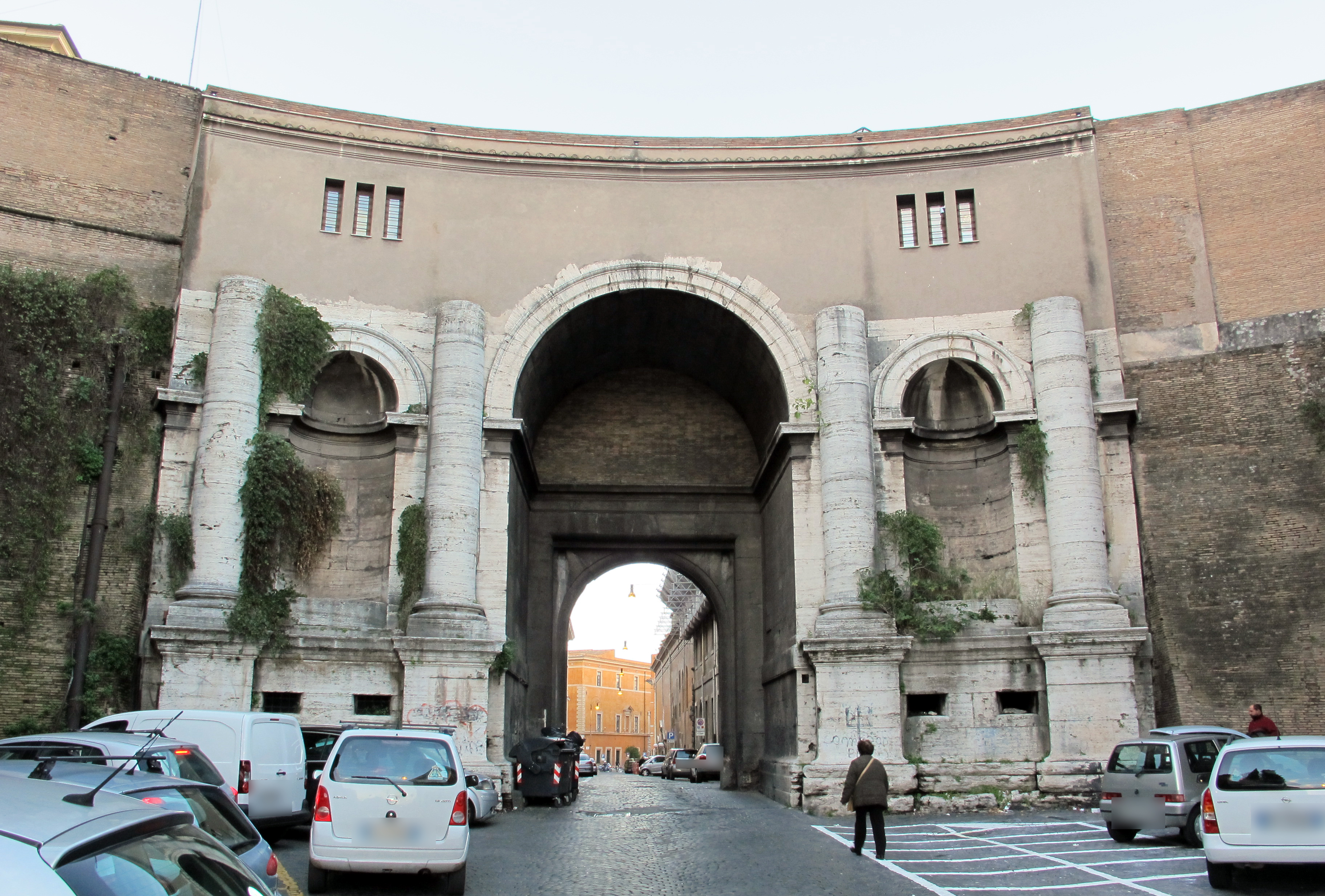
- Porta Santo Spirito, Rome

- Location within Rome
- Interactive map of Porta Santo Spirito
- 41.9003°N 12.4616°E
- Location: Rome

Porta Santo Spirito is one of the gates of the Leonine walls in Rome (Italy). It rises on the back side of the Hospital of the same name, in Via dei Penitenzieri, close to the crossing with Piazza della Rovere.

== History ==
It is one of the most ancient gates in the wall surrounding the Vatican, as it is contemporary to the building of the walls of Pope Leo IV, around 850.

Although it was the only direct connection between St. Peter's Basilica and the area of Trastevere (through Porta Settimiana), as well as the access to Via Aurelia nova, it was opened at first as a secondary passage.

Its former name was Posterula Saxonum (Postern of the Saxons). In effect, in 727 King Ine of Wessex, after having abdicated, moved to Rome, where he founded a Schola Saxonum (whose purpose was to provide a Catholic instruction to English clergy and nobles), together with a church and a graveyard. Saxon presence in the area is attested until the end of 12th century, when King John Lackland assigned the complex of the Schola to the building of the Church of Santa Maria in Saxia (now Church of Santo Spirito in Sassia) and of the still existing Hospital, whose foundations were settled in 794. On that occasion Pope Innocent III also modified the name of the gate, giving it the present one.

The structure withstood several restorations and enlargements. A remarkable one was probably carried out at the beginning of the 15th century, maybe by Pope Gregory XII, given that the gate is called Porta Nuova (Italian for "New Gate") in a document dated 1409. At the beginning of the following century, Pope Alexander VI substantially modified this gate, together with other ones, as well as the surrounding wall; finally, about forty years later, Pope Paul III also made some interventions, using the advice and services of such engineers as Michelangelo and Antonio da Sangallo the Younger. A new fear of raids by Saracen pirates, as well as the modern poliorcetic techniques suggesting a massive use of artilleries, persuaded Paul III to modernize the walls, giving them significant defensive characteristics.

With regards to the well-known contrast between the two artists, it is said that the works of the gate were based on a beautiful design by Sangallo and Buonarroti (who completed them after the death of the colleague, but in a hasty and rough way), since he could not demolish it, made some detrimental interventions to tarnish the work of the rival, as well as to take revenge for the merciless criticisms he received for his own design of Porta Pia.

Presently the gate shows indeed an unfinished aspect (especially in the upper part) with empty niches, and is almost hidden by the imposing Sangallo's bastion rising in the vicinity. Moreover, a century later the gate had already lost its function (just like Porta Settimiana), as it was included within the larger circle of the Janiculum walls, and there was no need to complete it.

== Bibliography ==
- Mauro Quercioli, "Le mura e le porte di Roma", Newton Compton, 1982
- Laura G. Cozzi, “Le porte di Roma”, F. Spinosi Ed., Rome, 1968

Preceded by Porta Pertusa	Landmarks of Rome; Porta Santo Spirito	Succeeded by Castra Praetoria
