= Porta Pertusa =

Gate of the Leonine Wall in Rome, Italy

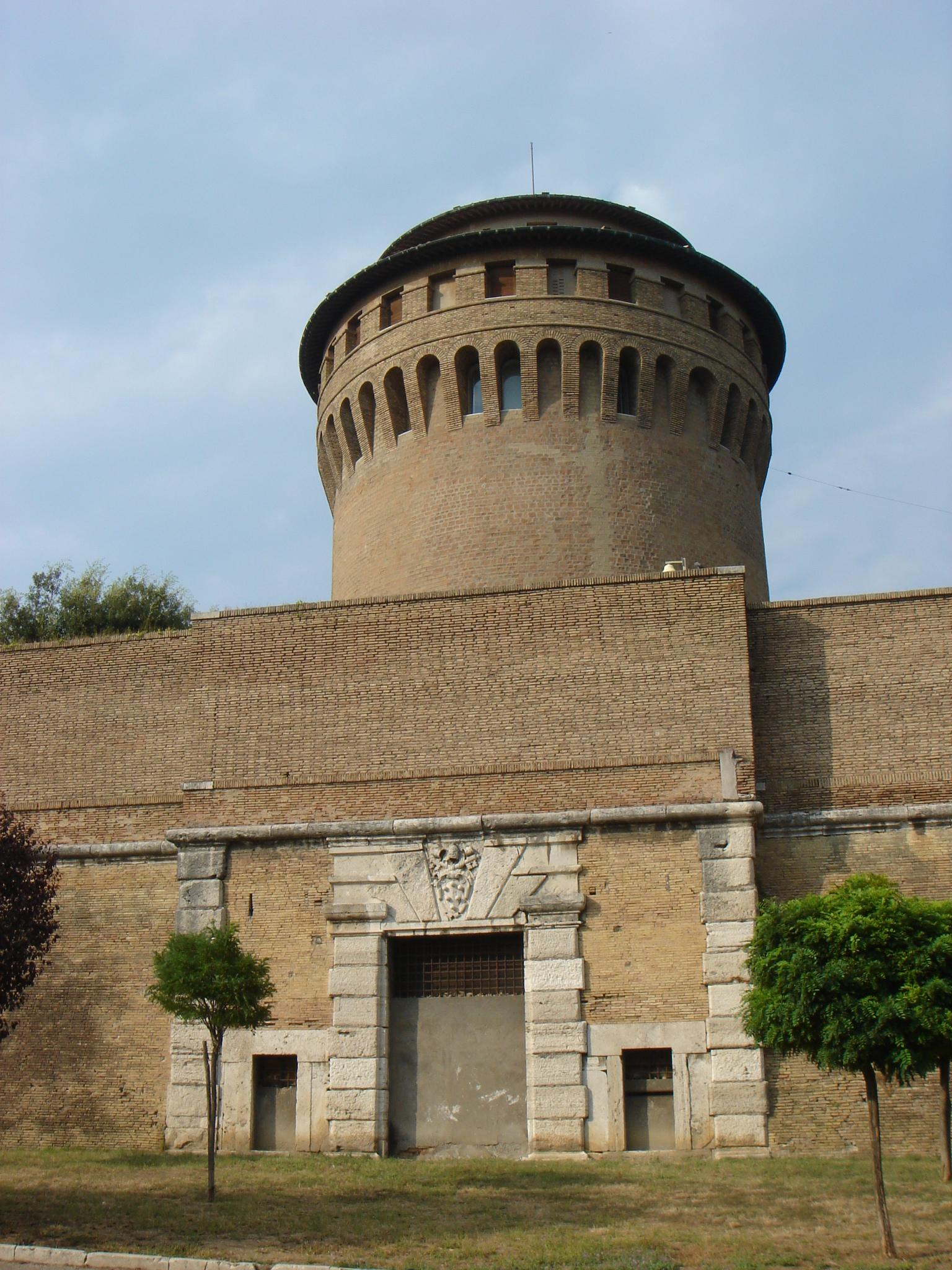
- Porta Pertusa with the Tower of S. Giovanni in the background

- Location within Rome
- Interactive map of Porta Pertusa
- 41.9012°N 12.4473°E
- Location: Rome

Porta Pertusa is one of the gates of the Leonine Wall in Rome (Italy).

== Description ==
The gate has three openings: two secondary accesses on both sides of the main gate, surrounded by a bossage, all of which are currently walled up. The gate rises in Viale Vaticano, close to the street of the same name; it is overlooked by the tower of San Giovanni (restored by Antipope John XXIII, who resided in it during the last years of his papacy), the south-western bastion of the former Leonine Wall.

The age of its construction is controversial, similar to that of the Porta Cavalleggeri. It probably dates back to the end of the 14th century, when the Popes, coming back to Rome from Avignon, returned their residence at the Vatican (thus leaving their previous residence in the Lateran). The three gates of the Leonine Wall (Note: The original wall of Pope Leo IV had just three accesses: the Posterula Sancti Angeli, porta San Pellegrino and the Posterula Saxonum.) turned out to be too few to meet the needs of the resulting population and building increase. It was created by drilling the former walls (in late Latin pertusus means "drilled") and probably its use was only for the Curia and not town traffic. Stefano Piale, having observed that there is no mention preceding that of the humanist Flavio Biondo, thinks that it was erected by antipope John XXIII, thus dating it at the first quarter of the 15th century. On the other hand, a document dating back to 1279 could make reference to it.

Almost no document refers to the postern placed just a little farther; the only known text calls it Porta Palatii.

The most substantial restoration, also involving the whole western stretch of the wall, was probably carried out by Pope Pius IV in 1565; the Pope died before the completion of the work, though a plaque with the coat of arms of his family, the Medici, has been placed close to the gate.

The gate was probably closed and re-opened several times: just one of these circumstances is known, since a 1655 document reports that it was opened during the visit of Queen Christina of Sweden. During the French siege of Rome in 1849 the French army regarded the Porta Pertusa as a possible way into the city, even though it had been walled up some years previously. The reason for this was that recent French maps incorrectly showed the gate as operational.

== Sources ==
- Mauro Quercioli, "Le mura e le porte di Roma", Newton Compton, 1982
- Laura G. Cozzi, “Le porte di Roma”, F. Spinosi Ed., Rome, 1968

Preceded by Porta Cavalleggeri	Landmarks of Rome; Porta Pertusa	Succeeded by Porta Santo Spirito
