= Santa Maria delle Grazie alle Fornaci fuori Porta Cavalleggeri =

- Church of Saint Mary of the Graces at the Kilns outside the Cavalleggeri Gate
- Chiesa di Santa Maria delle Grazie alle Fornaci fuori Porta Cavalleggeri
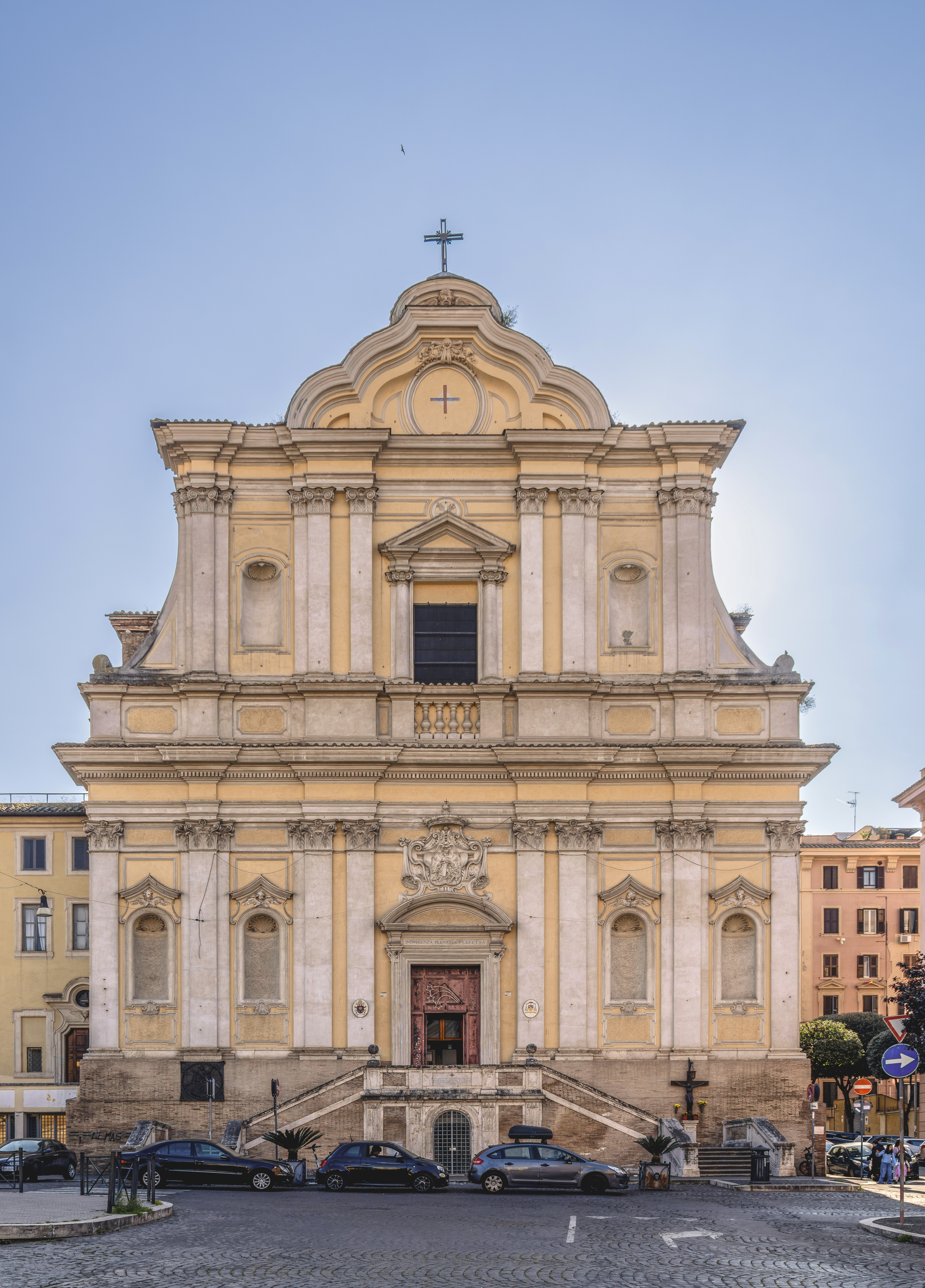
- Facade
- Click on the map for a fullscreen view
- 41.897630°N 12.454743°E
- Location: Piazza di Santa Maria alle Fornaci, Rome
- Country: Italy
- Language: Italian
- Denomination: Catholic
- Tradition: Roman Rite
- Religious order: Trinitarian Order
- Website: parrocchiasantamariadellegrazieallefornaci.org

History
- Status: titular church
- Founded: 15th century
- Dedication: Mary (as Our Lady of Graces)

Architecture
- Architectural type: Baroque
- Completed: 18th century

Administration
- Diocese: Rome

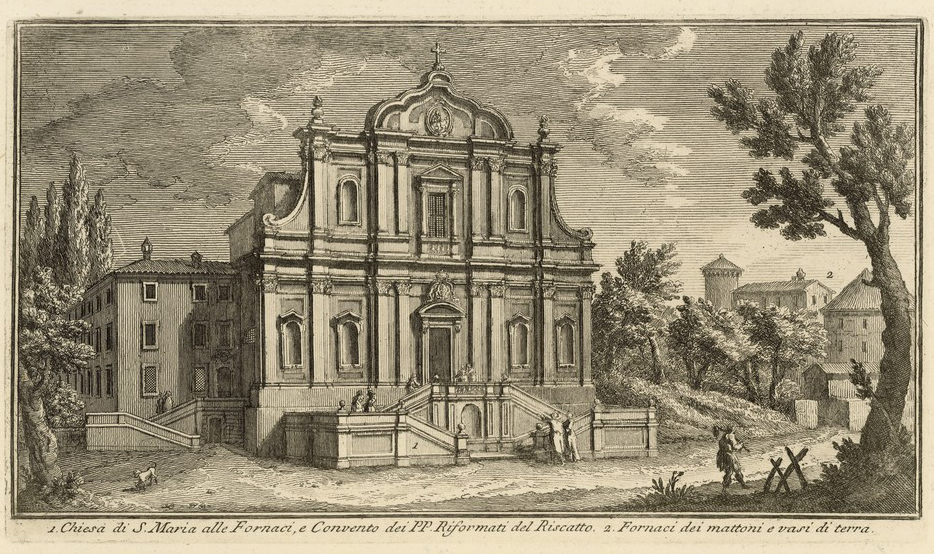
Engraving of the church, 1756 (Giuseppe Vasi)

Santa Maria delle Grazie alle Fornaci fuori Porta Cavalleggeri is a Baroque style, Roman Catholic parish and titular church located at Piazza di Santa Maria alle Fornaci, south of Vatican City and north of the San Pietro train station in the Aurelio quarter. It was made a cardinalate deaconry by Pope John Paul II on 25 May 1985, and assigned it to Cardinal Duraisamy Simon Lourdusamy, then Prefect of the Congregation for the Oriental Churches. The church became vacant on 2 June 2014 after the death of Cardinal Lourdusamy. On November 11, 2016 it was announced that Mario Zenari will succeed him.

== History ==
It was originally built in the 14th century, and served a small suburban parish which became important as a site for preparing materials for the building of the new St Peter’s. The name Fornaci refers to kilns used for making bricks for the work. Since another church by the same name was located in Borgo the reference to Fornaci was necessary to distinguish them.

At the end of the 17th century it was rebuilt by Francesco Multò for the Discalced Trinitarians (a Spanish reform of the Trinitarian Order), whose monastery was adjacent, and in 1720 Filippo Raguzzini added the façade. In 1850 it took over parochial responsibilities for the area from Sant'Angelo alle Fornaci, which had just been destroyed. A campanile in Baroque style was added in the 1950s.

The title of the cardinalate added fuori Porta Cavalleggeri ("outside the Porta Cavalleggeri") to the name of the church. The dedication is to the Blessed Virgin Mary under her title of Our Lady of Graces.

== Exterior decoration ==
The plan is based on a Greek cross, with a very short nave and two transepts of the same length. The presbyterium has an integral semi-circular apse. There is a very low central octagonal drum dome which was never completed but which was capped by eight tiled roof pitches which meet at the apex without a lantern. The other roofs are also pitched and tiled, and the walls are of brick. The two-storey façade is false, as it is substantially higher than the nave behind it. It features eight Corinthian pilasters, the inner two pairs flanking the door being double. The entrance has a segmental pediment crowned by a coat of arms in stucco featuring an angel, and in between the pilasters are two pairs of round-headed niches crowned by triangular pediments. The top storey has one window with triangular pediment, flanked by six pilasters (inner ones double) and crowned by an ogee pediment with a little segment on top.

A campanile was built on the right hand side of the apse in the 20th century, a square Baroque tower with pale yellow walls and white architectural details. The large open sound-holes are balustraded, and there is a double pagoda cap in lead.

== Interior decoration ==
The interior is decorated in the first altar on the right with a stucco statue by Giovanni Battista Maini and lateral paintings by Francesco Scaramucci; the second chapel has a Holy Trinity with Saints of the Order of the Reformed friars of the Rescue by the Neapolitan Onofrio Avellino; the third chapel has a San Giovanni di Matha by Francesco Fusi; in the chapel dedicated to the Virgin is an image painted by the Flemish Aegidius Alet; the first altar on the left was decorated with a Sacred Family by Giuseppe Bartolomeo Chiari and lateral paintings by Niccola Ricciolini, on the left by Pietro Bianchi; and lunettes by Marco Benefial. The dome decoration is by Pietro da Pietri.
