= Porta Cavalleggeri =

Gate of the Leonine Wall in Rome, Italy

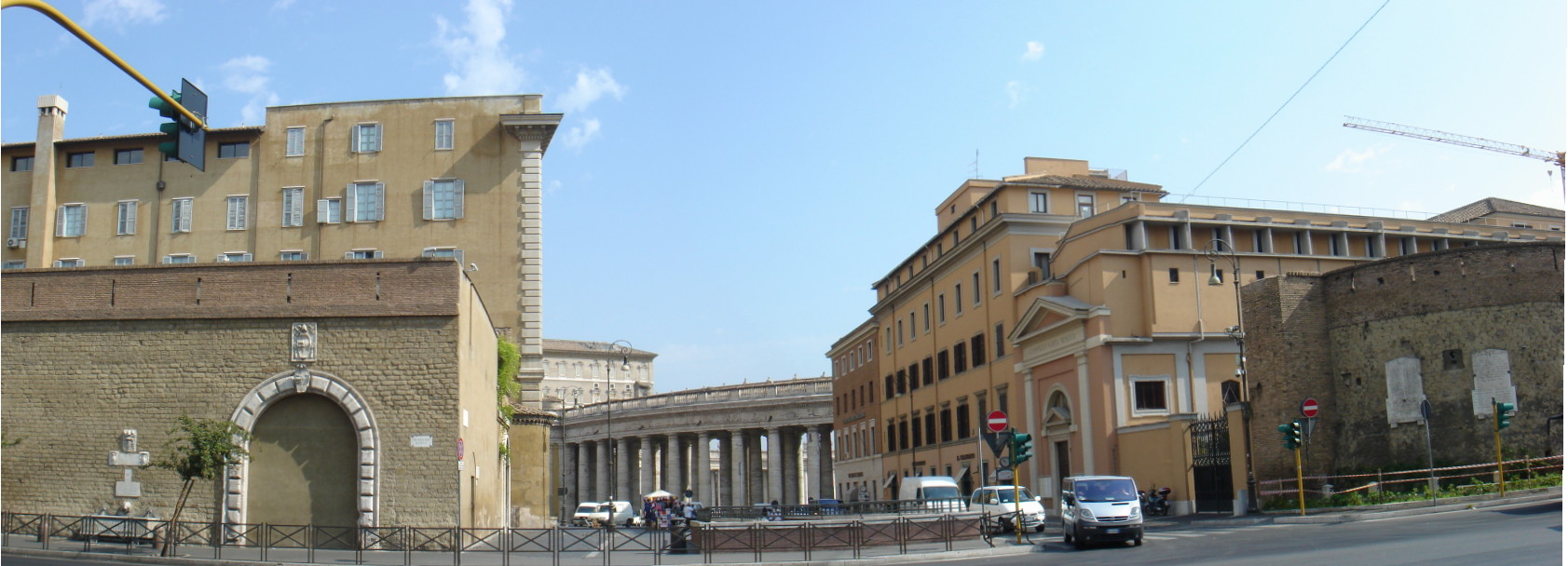
- Porta Cavalleggeri (left) and the remains of the “Turrionis” (right)

- Location within Rome
- Interactive map of Porta Cavalleggeri
- 41°54′N 12°27′E
- Location: Rome

Porta Cavalleggeri was one of the gates of the Leonine Wall in Rome (Italy).

== Gate ==
Its remains are now walled in the stretch of wall facing the square that takes its name after it: this is nevertheless a recreation, since the original location of the gate, until 1904, was some meters away, on the other side of Piazza del Sant’Uffizio.

Its former name was Porta ad Scholam Longobardorum, due to its vicinity to a community of Lombards that had settled close to it. (Note: In a similar way, Porta Santo Spirito was formerly called Porta Saxonum for its vicinity to an English community.) It was later named Porta Turrionis, as it rose alongside the tower (whose building date is uncertain, but surely restored by Antonio da Sangallo the Younger during the papacy of Paul III), that is still visible at the entrance of Galleria Principe Amedeo. When Pope Pius IV built the barracks of the Cavalry Guard Regiment in the vicinity, the gate took the name it still bears.

The age of its construction is quite controversial (just the same as Porta Pertusa). According to Nibby, it was erected soon after the return of the Popes from the Avignon Papacy, that is at the end of the 14th century, when the pontiffs, coming back to Rome from Avignon with a large retinue, took up definitively their residence in Vatican (thus leaving their previous residence in Lateran). The three gates of the Leonine Wall. (Note: The original wall of Pope Leo IV had just three accesses: the Posterula Sancti Angeli, porta San Pellegrino and the Posterula Saxonum.) turned out to be too few to meet the needs of the resulting population and building increase. On the other hand Stefano Piale, on the basis of a 1590 document and some previous quotes, maintains that it was built by Pope Nicholas V, thus dating it back to mid-14th century. Other quotes even backdate it to the building of the walls of Pope Leo IV, in about 850, but they appear to be scarcely reliable, as they clash with most of the texts, some of which are absolutely accredited. Moreover, references to Porta Turrionis appear just in reports and chronicles subsequent to the end of the 14th century.

On the top of the arch are still visible two coats of arms of the House of Borgia, placed by Pope Alexander VI in memory of the restoration works that involved the gate and the surrounding stretch of wall about in 1500. The aspect of the gate and of the restoration is the one still visible nowadays.

In this place, on 30 April 1849, the Brigade of General Pierre Alexandre Jean Mollière (belonging to the French army led by General Nicolas Charles Victor Oudinot) launched its first attack against the Roman Republic. The gate was defended by the 2nd Brigade of the 8th Battalion, led by General Luigi Masi, made up of 1,000 men from the National Guard and 1,700 men from the Papal troops, among which there was the actor Tommaso Salvini. On that occasion the French were rejected.

== Legacy ==
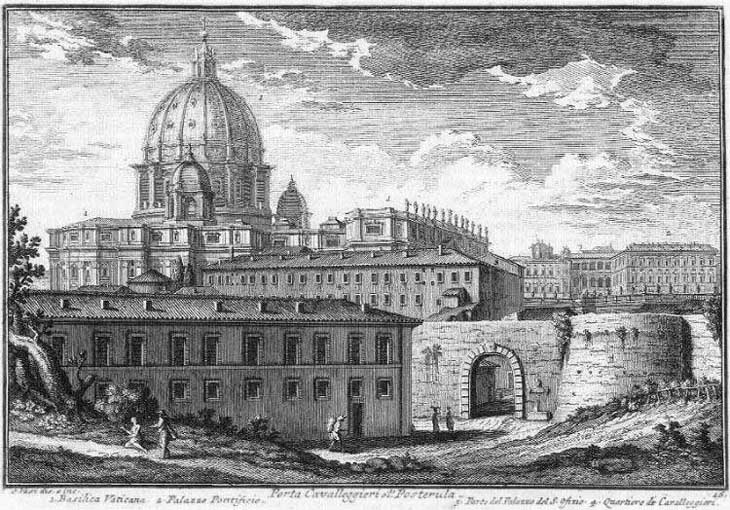
Porta Cavalleggeri (outer side) in an etching by Giuseppe Vasi (18th century)

It gives its name to the church of Santa Maria delle Grazie alle Fornaci fuori Porta Cavalleggeri ("Our Lady of the Graces at the Kilns outside the Cavalleggeri Gate").

== Bibliography ==
- Mauro Quercioli, Le mura e le porte di Roma, Newton Compton, 1982
- Laura G. Cozzi, “Le porte di Roma”, F. Spinosi Ed., Rome, 1968
- Trevelyan, George Macaulay (1909). Garibaldi's Defence of the Roman Republic. Bologna: Zanichelli.
- Fracassi, Claudio (2005). La meravigliosa storia della repubblica dei briganti Roma 1849 (in Italian). Mursia. ISBN 88-425-3425-0.

Preceded by Porta Tiburtina	Landmarks of Rome; Porta Cavalleggeri	Succeeded by Porta Pertusa
