= Via Portuensis =

Ancient Roman road

The Via Portuensis was an ancient Roman road, leading to the Portus constructed by Claudius on the right bank of the Tiber, at its mouth. It started from the Pons Aemilius, and the first part of its course is identical with that of the Via Campana. The Porta Portuensis of the Aurelian Walls had a double arch, probably owing to the amount of traffic it had to carry, but the divergence occurred a good deal further on, probably a mile from the gate. The Via Portuensis went to the right into hilly country, while the Via Campana kept to the valley of the Tiber. The roads rejoined at the modern Ponte Galeria.

With the growth of importance of the Via Portuensis from the time of Constantine onwards, that of the Via Ostiensis correspondingly decreased. Procopius, who describes how barges were dragged up the river by teams of oxen moving along it, must be describing the towpath, and not either the Via Portuensis or even the Via Campana, which is in many places at quite a considerable distance from the winding course of the river.

Its large amounts of traffic caused the road to be eventually reconstructed with two parallel roads: one for traffic going one way and the other for traffic going the other. It is considered to have been the world's first dual carriageway.

Today Rome's Via Portuense follows a similar path. The road starts today from the Porta Portese and, after Ponte Galeria, ends in the comune of Fiumicino.

== Findings ==
A Latin plaque, dating from the early 2nd century AD, commemorates a Jewish woman named Regina as "obedient to the Law," and a bilingual Latin and Greek epitaph records a woman named Victorina, described as righteous, holy, and a lover of the commandments; her stone is adorned with a menorah, etrog and shofar.
