= Porta Portese =

Ancient city gate, a landmark of Rome, Italy

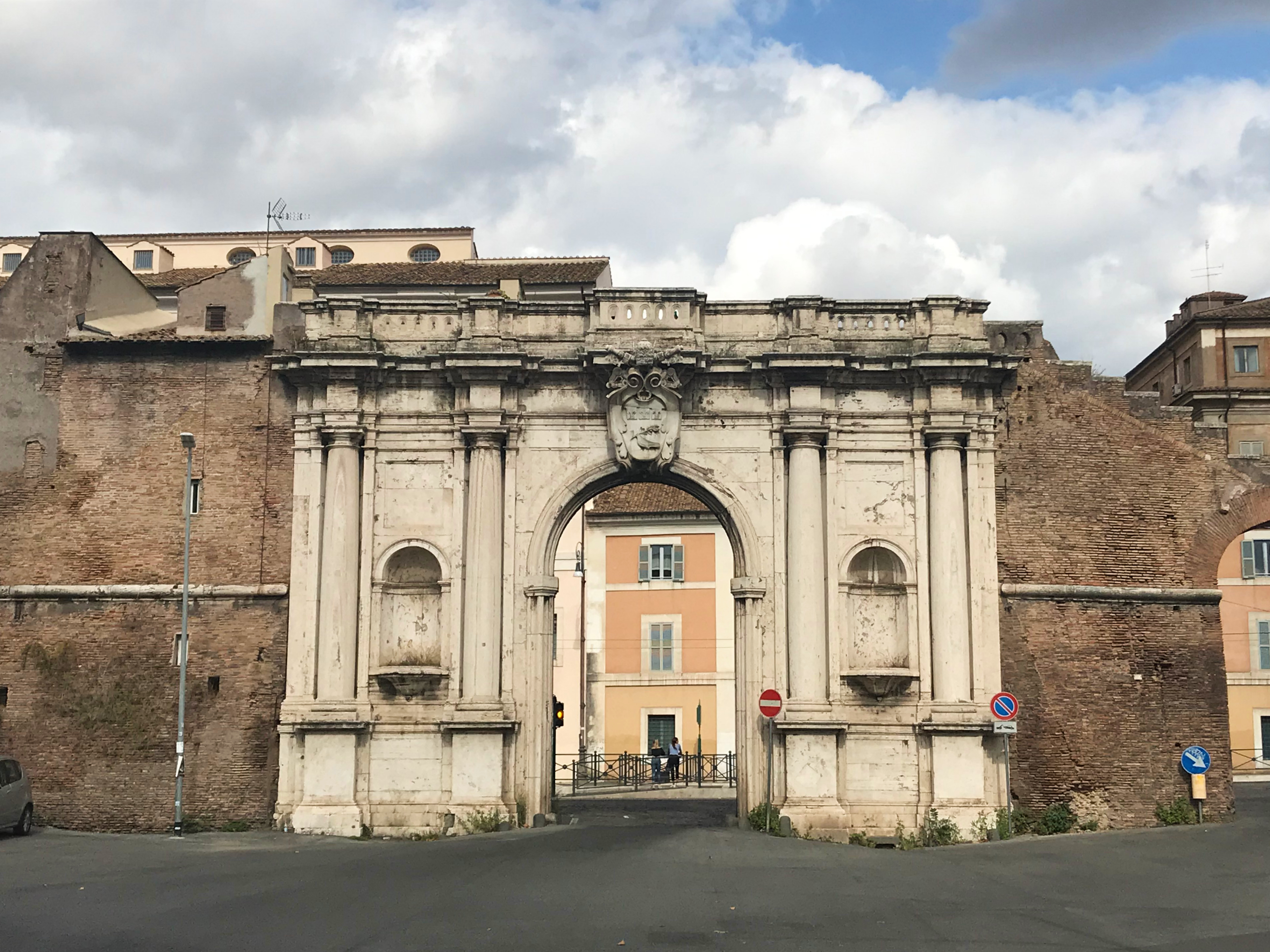
- Porta Portese

- Location within Rome
- Interactive map of Porta Portese
- 41°53′02″N 12°28′26″E

Porta Portese is an ancient city gate, located at the end of Via Portuense, where it meets Via Porta Portese, about a block from the banks of the Tiber on the southern edge of the Rione Trastevere of Rome, Italy.

== History ==
The gate was built in 1644 as part of the Janiculum Walls which replaced the Porta Portuensis. The gate and walls were built by Vincenzo Maculani; and commissioned by Pope Urban VIII. Just outside the gate, a large arsenal was erected by Clement XI starting from 1714.

Until the late 19th century, the Ripa Grande port (then the main river port of the city) was located nearby. The Via Portuensis starts from it, which originally connected the city to Portus.

A popular flea market is held every Sunday in the area of Porta Portese.

== See also ==
- Porta San Pancrazio – Gate of the Aurelian Walls, a landmark of Rome, Italy
- Papal Navy

Preceded by Porta del Popolo	Landmarks of Rome; Porta Portese	Succeeded by Porta San Pancrazio
