= Trastevere =

- Rione of Rome
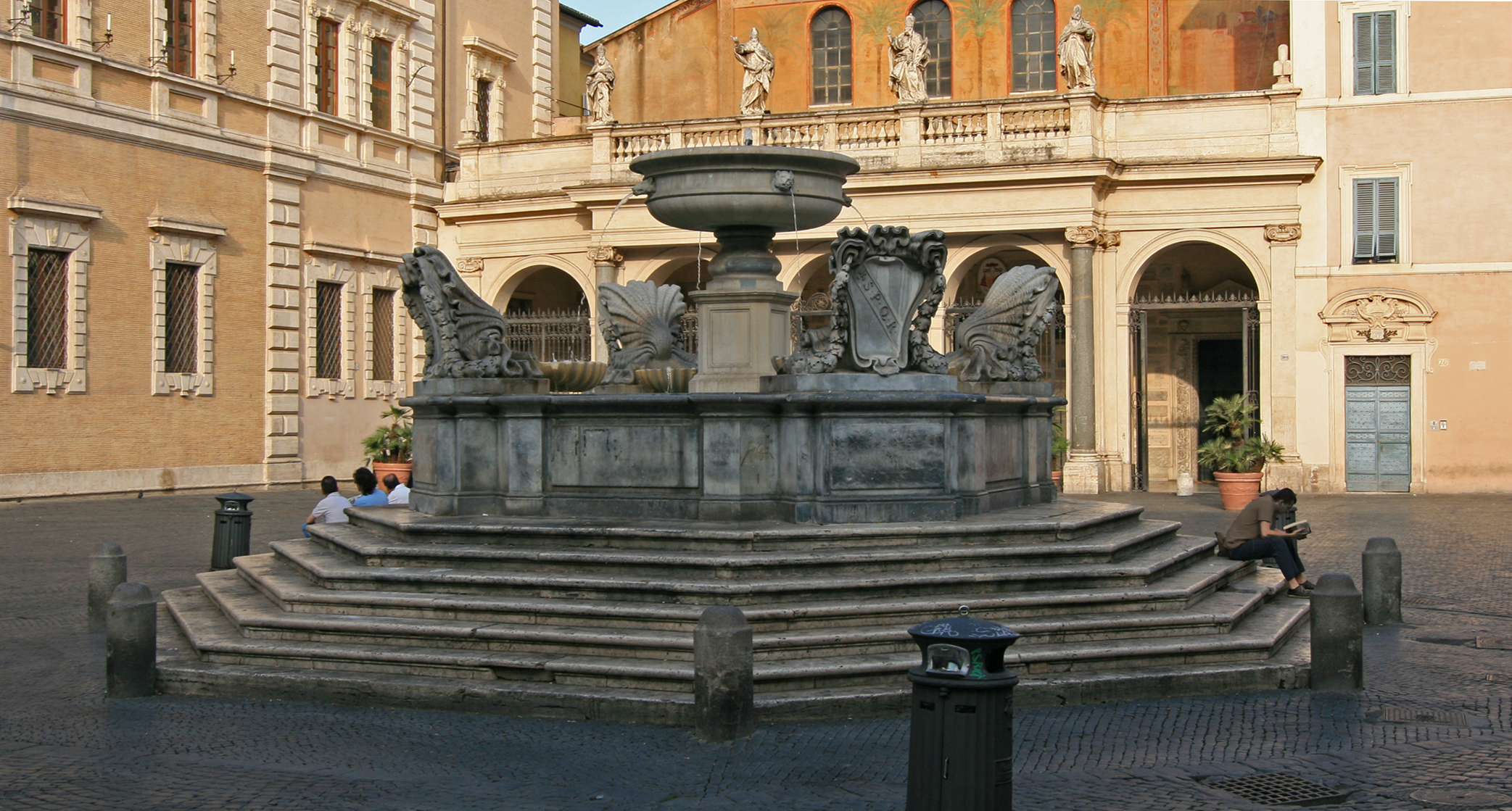
- Piazza di Santa Maria in Trastevere and its distinctive fountain

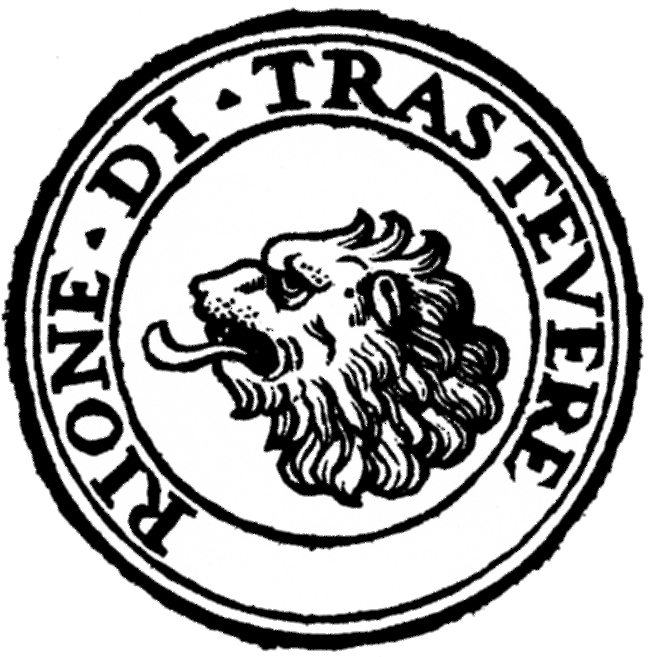
- Seal

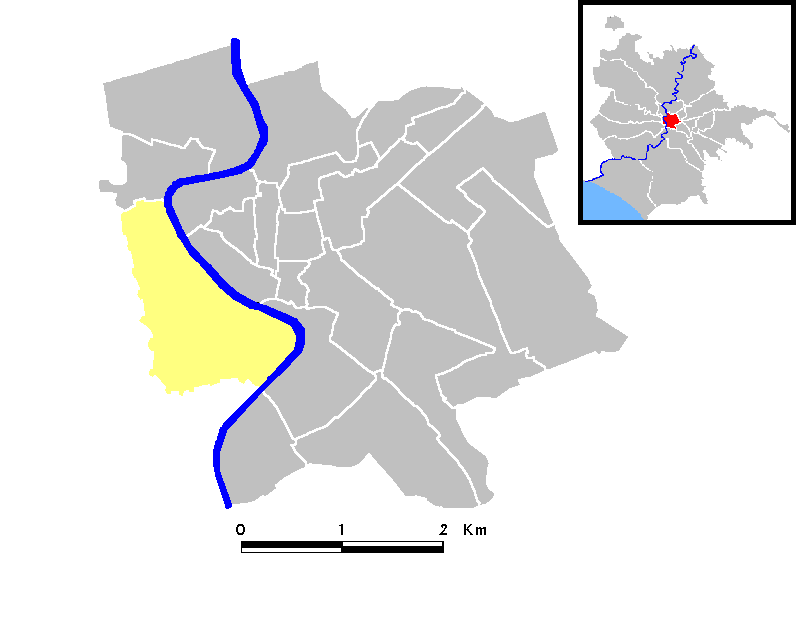
- Position of the rione within the center of the city
- Country: Italy
- Region: Lazio
- Province: Rome
- Comune: Rome
- Demonym: Trasteverini
- Time zone: UTC+1 (CET)
  - Summer (DST): UTC+2 (CEST)

Trastevere (Italian: [trasˈteːvere]) is the 13th rione of Rome, Italy. It is identified by the initials R. XIII and it is located within Municipio I. Its name comes from Latin trans Tiberim (lit. 'beyond the Tiber').

Its coat of arms depicts a golden head of a lion on a red background, the meaning of which is uncertain.

== History ==
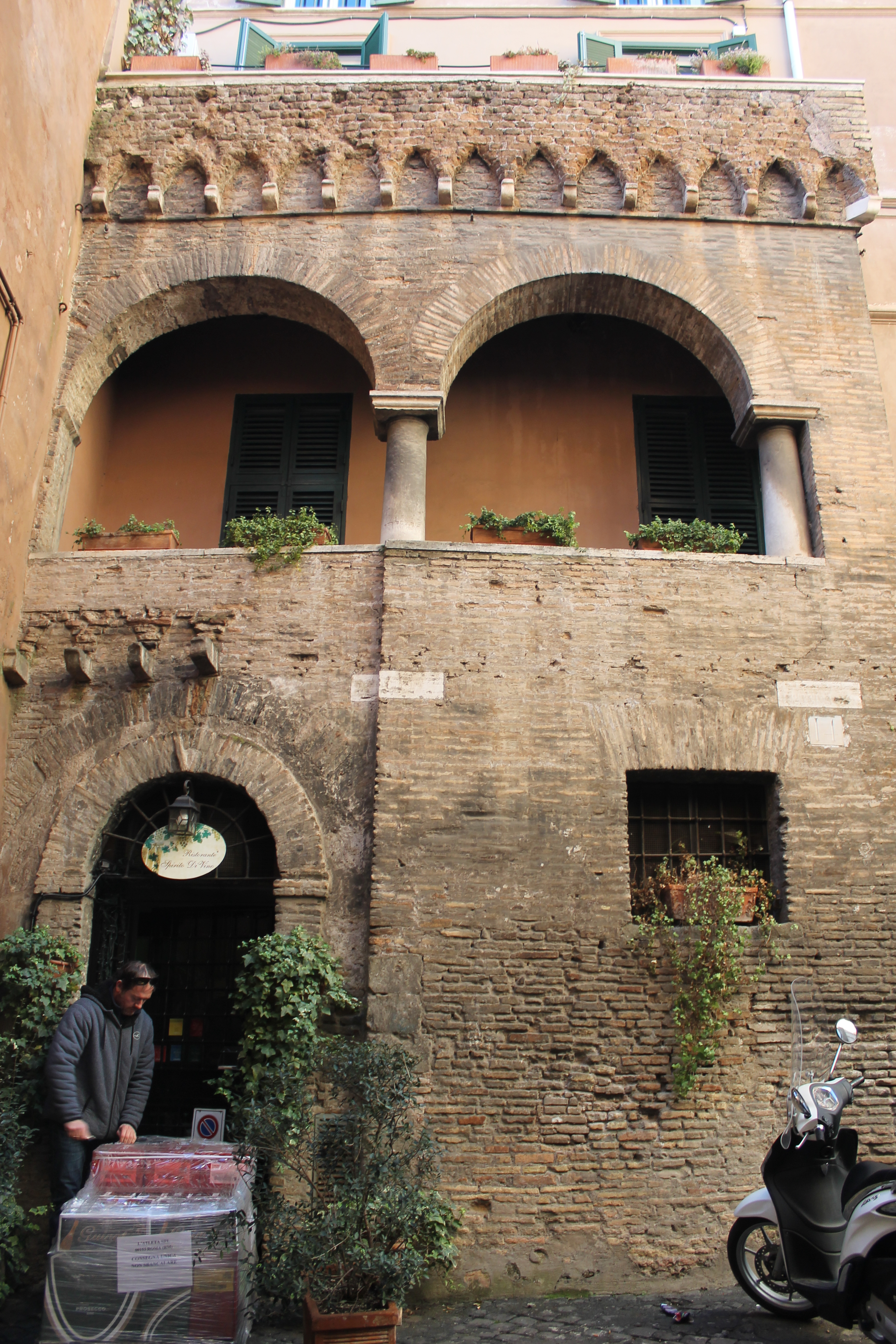
Rome's First Synagogue in Vicolo dell'Atleta

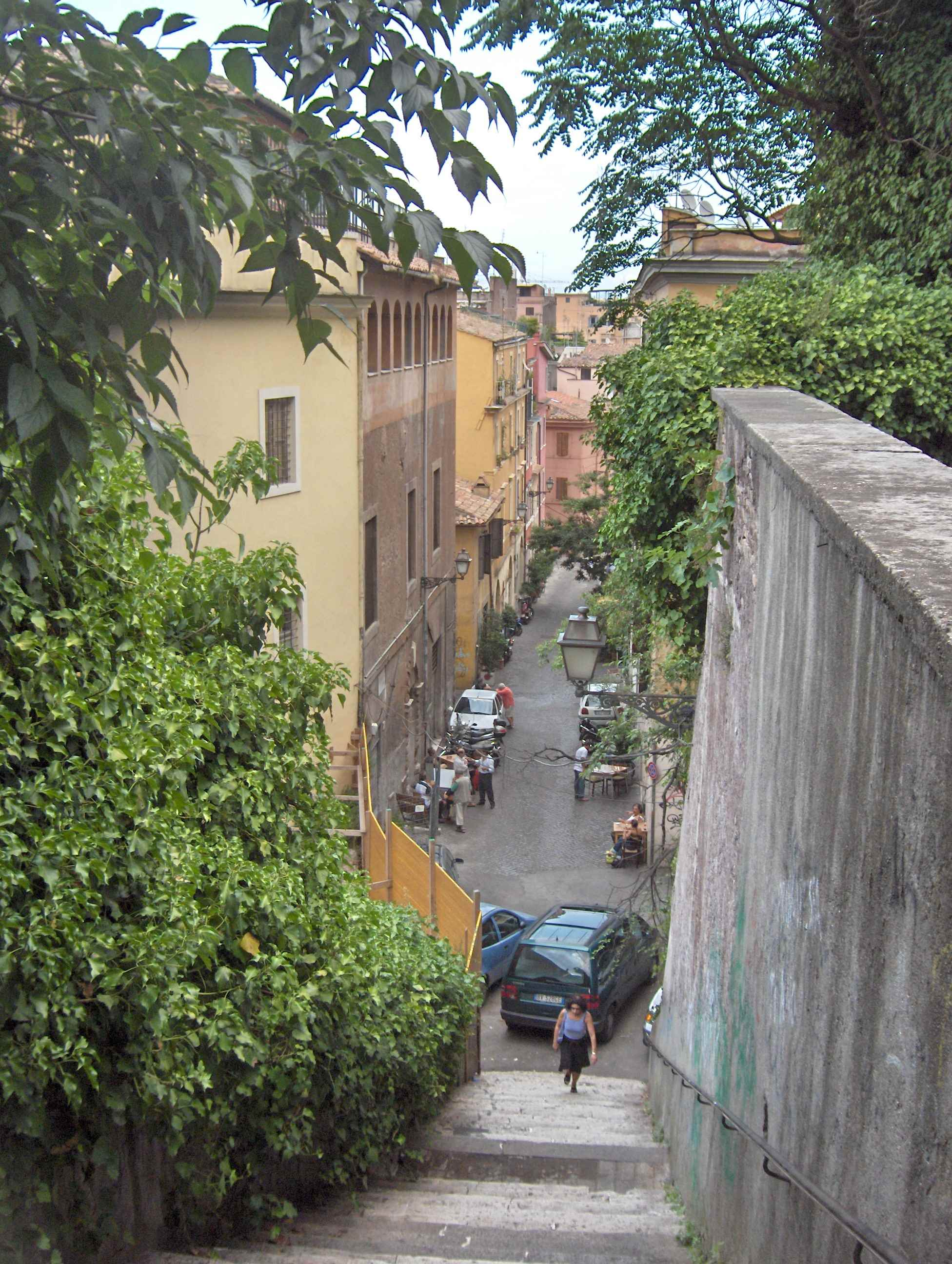
A typical narrow alley in Trastevere seen from the lower slopes of the Gianicolo hill

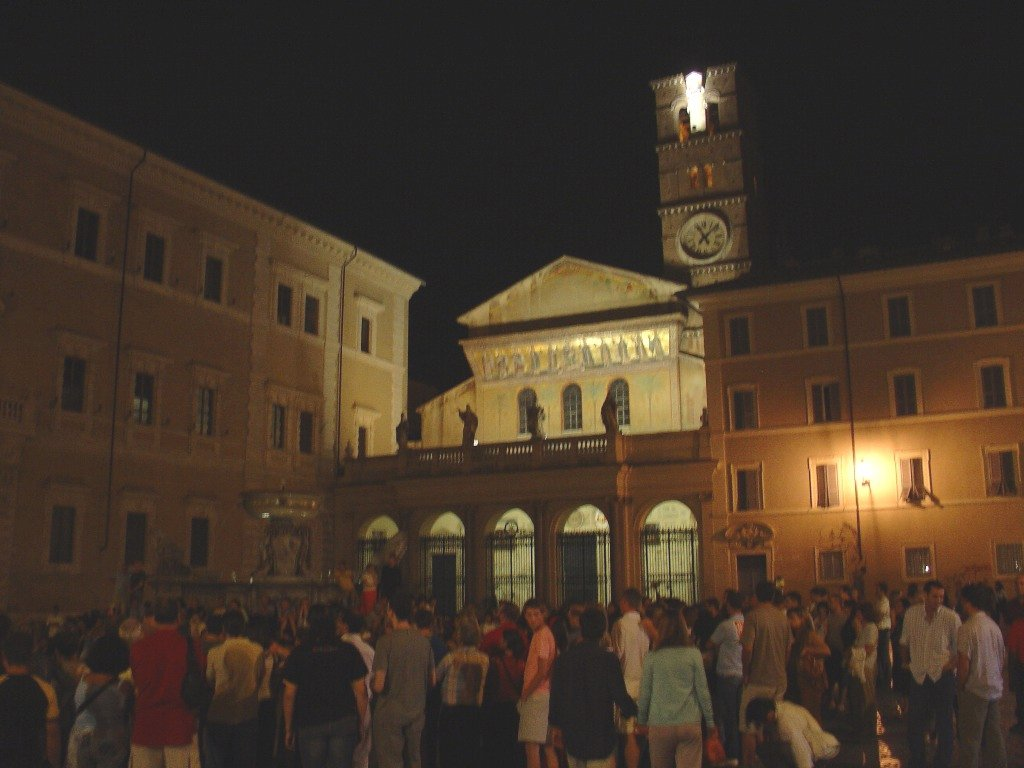
Piazza Santa Maria in Trastevere at night

In Rome's Regal period (753–509 BC), the area across the Tiber belonged to the Etruscans: the Romans named it Ripa Etrusca (Etruscan bank). Rome conquered it to gain control of and access to the river from both banks, but was not interested in building on that side of the river. In fact, the only connection between Trastevere and the rest of the city was a small wooden bridge called the Pons Sublicius (English: 'bridge on wooden piles').

By the time of the Republic c. 509 BC, the number of sailors and fishermen making a living from the river had increased, and many had taken up residence in Trastevere. Immigrants from the East also settled there, mainly Jews and Syrians. The area began to be considered part of the city under Augustus, who divided Rome into 14 regions (regiones in Latin); modern Trastevere was the XIV and was called Trans Tiberim.

Since the end of the Roman Republic the quarter was also the center of an important Jewish community, which lived there until the end of the Middle Ages. Rome's oldest remaining synagogue, though not used as such any longer, is found in the district. The building was constructed in 980, and became a synagogue in 1073 through the efforts of lexicographer Nathan ben Yechiel. Within the building there was also a mikveh. At the base of the central column Hebrew writing is still visible. Its use as a synagogue ended when the Jews were forced to move to the Roman ghetto on the other side of the Tiber river in the mid-16th century. It is now used commercially, and can be found at 14, Vicolo dell’Atleta.

With the wealth of the Imperial Age, several important figures decided to build their villae in Trastevere, including Clodia, (Catullus' "friend") and Julius Caesar (his garden villa, the Horti Caesaris). The regio included two of the most ancient churches in Rome, the Titulus Callixti, later called the Basilica di Santa Maria in Trastevere, and the Titulus Cecilae, Santa Cecilia in Trastevere.

In order to have a stronghold on the right Bank and to control the Gianicolo hill, Transtiberim was partially included by Emperor Aurelian (270–275) inside the wall erected to defend the city against the Germanic tribes.

In the Middle Ages Trastevere had narrow, winding, irregular streets; moreover, because of the mignani (structures on the front of buildings) there was no space for carriages to pass. At the end of the 15th century these mignani were removed. Nevertheless, Trastevere remained a maze of narrow streets. There was a strong contrast between the large, opulent houses of the upper classes and the small, dilapidated houses of the poor. The streets had no pavement until the time of Sixtus IV at the end of the 15th century. At first bricks were used, but these were later replaced by sampietrini (cobble stones), which were more suitable for carriages. Thanks to its partial isolation (it was "beyond the Tiber") and to the fact that its population had been multicultural since the ancient Roman period, the inhabitants of Trastevere, called Trasteverini, developed a culture of their own. In 1744 Benedict XIV modified the borders of the rioni, giving Trastevere its modern limits.

== Modern day ==
Nowadays, Trastevere maintains its character thanks to its narrow cobbled streets lined by ancient houses. At night, natives and tourists alike flock to its many pubs and restaurants, but much of the original character of Trastevere remains. The area is also home to several foreign academic institutions including The American University of Rome and John Cabot University (both of which are private American universities), the American Academy in Rome, the Rome campus of the Thomas More College of Liberal Arts, the Canadian University of Waterloo School of Architecture (between the months of September and December), and the American Pratt Institute School of Architecture therefore serving as home to an international student body.

The neighborhood has attracted artists, foreign expats, and many famous people. In the sixties and seventies, the American musicians/composers Frederic Rzewski and Richard Teitelbaum, of the group Musica Elettronica Viva, lived in Via della Luce. Sergio Leone, the director of Spaghetti Westerns, grew up in Viale Glorioso (there is a marble plaque to his memory on the wall of the apartment building), and went to a Catholic private school in the neighborhood. Ennio Morricone, the film music composer, went to the same school, and for one year was in the same class as Sergio Leone.

== Geography ==
The rione is on the west bank of the River Tiber, south of Vatican City, in the plain between the meander of the river and the Janiculum Hill. In addition to the river, which marks the eastern border of the borough, the area is delimited to the west and to the south by the Janiculum walls, and to the north by the Galleria Principe Amedeo di Savoia-Aosta tunnel.

=== Boundaries ===
To the north, Trastevere borders with Borgo (R. XIV), whose border is defined by a portion of the walls of Urban VIII, beside Rampa del Sangallo and Viale delle Mura Aurelie, by Piazza della Rovere and by Ponte Principe Amedeo.

To the east, the rione borders with Ponte (R. V), Regola (R. VII) and Ripa (R. XII): the border is marked by the stretch of the Tiber between Ponte Principe Amedeo and Ponte Sublicio.

To the south, Trastevere borders with Quartiere Portuense (Q. XI), from which is separated by a short stretch of the Aurelian Walls beside Piazza di Porta Portese; as well as with Quartiere Aurelio (Q. XIII), from which is separated by the stretch of the Walls between Porta Portese and Porta San Pancrazio.

Westward, it borders with Quartiere Gianicolense (Q. XII), whose boundary is marked by the Aurelian Walls, alongside Viale delle Mura Aurelie.

== Places of interest ==
=== Palaces and other buildings ===
- Palazzo Corsini alla Lungara, in Via della Lungara, seat of the botanical garden of Rome.
- Villa Farnesina, in Via della Lungara.
- Palazzo San Callisto, fronting Piazza Santa Maria in Trastevere and Piazza di San Calisto. Vatican extraterritorial building. Houses some departments of the Roman Curia.
- Villa Lante al Gianicolo, in Passeggiata del Gianicolo.
- Villa Sciarra, in Via Calandrelli.
- Villa Spada, in Via Giacomo Medici, built in 1639, seat of the Irish embassy to the Holy See. 41.887709°N 12.464380°E
- Regina Coeli, in Via della Lungara.
- San Michele a Ripa.

=== Churches ===
- Santa Maria in Trastevere
- Santa Maria dell'Orto
- San Crisogono
- Santa Cecilia in Trastevere
- Santa Maria dei Sette Dolori
- San Pietro in Montorio
- San Callisto
- Sant'Agata in Trastevere
- Sant'Onofrio al Gianicolo
- San Benedetto in Piscinula
- Santa Maria della Luce
- Santi Maria e Gallicano
- Sante Rufina e Seconda
- Santa Margherita in Trastevere
- Chiesa di San Cosimato
- Santi Quaranta Martiri e San Pasquale Baylon
- San Francesco a Ripa
- San Giovanni Battista dei Genovesi
- Santa Maria in Cappella
- Sant'Egidio
- Santa Maria della Scala
- Santa Dorotea
- San Giovanni della Malva in Trastevere
- Santa Croce alla Lungara
- San Giacomo alla Lungara
- San Giuseppe alla Lungara
- San Giosafat al Gianicolo
- Sant'Antonio Maria Zaccaria
- Oratory of Santa Maria Addolorata in Trastevere
- Santa Maria del Buon Viaggio
- Sacro Cuore di Gesù a Villa Lante
- San Francesco e Santa Caterina patroni d'Italia
- Santa Maria del Ritiro al Gianicolo
- Santa Maria della Visitazione e San Francesco di Sales

=== Fountains ===
- Fountain in Piazza Santa Maria in Trastevere
- Fontana dell'Acqua Paola
- Fontanone di Ponte Sisto

=== Piazzas ===
- Piazza di Santa Maria in Trastevere
- Piazza Trilussa
- Piazza di San Cosimato
- Piazza di San Calisto
- Piazza di San Francesco d'Assisi
- Piazza Giuseppe Giochino Belli
- Piazza de' Renzi
- Piazza di Sant'Egidio
- Piazza della Scala
- Piazza Mastai
- Cortile Santa Ceclila in Trastevere
- Piazza dei Mercanti
- Piazza Bernardino da Feltre

=== Education ===
Public libraries in Trastevere include Casa della Memoria e della Storia.

== See also ==
- Leonine City
- Naumachia of Augustus
