= Porta Tiburtina =

Gate of the Aurelian walls, a landmark of Rome, Italy

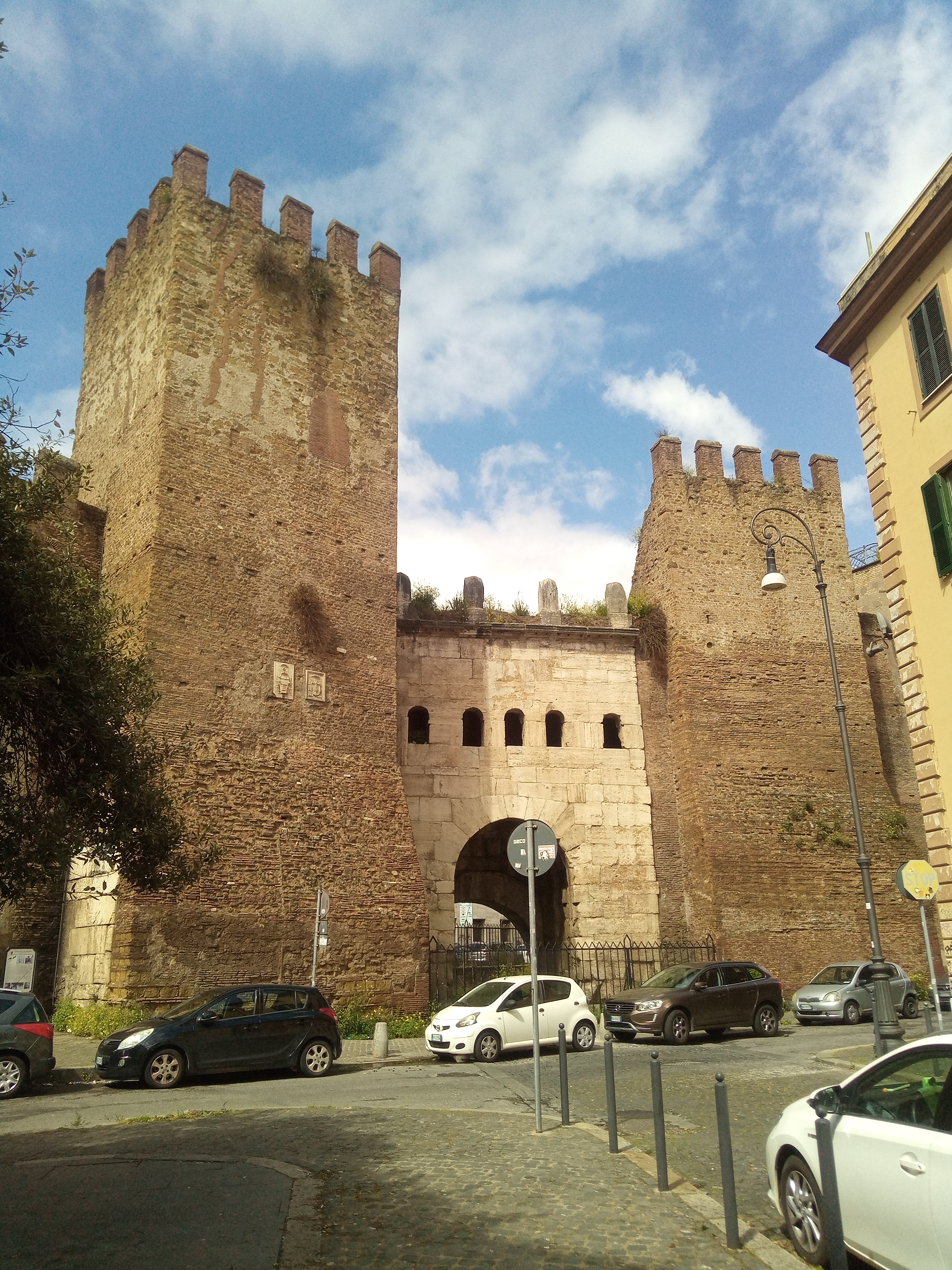
- Porta Tiburtina today, view from outside the Aurelian Walls. During its long history, the gate was also called Porta San Lorenzo, Capo de Bove and Porta Taurina.

- Location within Rome
- Interactive map of Porta Tiburtina
- 41°53′51″N 12°30′37″E
- Location: Rome

Porta Tiburtina or Porta San Lorenzo is a gate in the Aurelian Walls of Rome, Italy, through which the Via Tiburtina exits the city.

== History ==
The gate originally was an arch, built under Augustus, in the point in which three aqueducts (Aqua Marcia, Aqua Julia and Aqua Tepula) passed over the Via Tiburtina. The arch was restored by Emperors Titus and Caracalla.

The arch of Augustus was incorporated in the Aurelian Walls by Emperor Aurelian. At the time of Honorius' restoration, in the 5th century, a second, external opening was built, with five small openings that enlightened the room where the gate was operated.

With time, the gate changed its name into Porta San Lorenzo, because of the presence of the close by basilica of San Lorenzo fuori le Mura. Common people, however, called it "Capo de bove" or "Porta Taurina", since the arch of Augustus was decorated with bull skulls.

The gate is the witness of the victory obtained in the evening of 20 November 1347 by the Roman popular leader Cola di Rienzo against the city's barons forces, in which the latter's leader Stefano Colonna was killed.

In 1869 or 1870, Pope Pius IX ordered the removal of much of the surviving stonework of the Porta Tiburtina to build a monumental column to the Ecumenical Council, which was never completed due to the Capture of Rome.

Next to the gate, there is the church of Santa Bibiana.

== Gate ==
The arch of Augustus bears three inscriptions. On the top, on the Aqua Julia, a 5 BC inscription that reads:

CAESAR DIVI IULI F(ilius) AUGUSTUS PONTIFEX MAXIMUS CO(n)S(ul) XII TRIBUNIC(ia) POTESTAT(e) XIX IMP(erator) XIIII RIVOS AQUARUM OMNIUM REFECIT

Imperator Caesar Augustus, son of the divine Julius, pontifex maximus, consul for the twelfth time, tribune of the plebs for the nineteenth time, imperator for the fourteenth time, restored the channels of all the aqueducts.

In the middle, the Aqua Tepula bears a legend dating to Emperor Caracalla restoration, in 212:

CAES(ar) M(arcus) AURELLIUS ANTONINUS PIUS FELIX AUG(ustus) PARTH(icus) MAXIM(us) BRIT(annicus) MAXIMUS PONTIFEX MAXIMUS AQUAM MARCIAM VARIIS KASIBUS IMPEDITAM purgato fonte excisis et perforatis montibus restituta forma adquisito etiam fonte novo Antoniniano in sacram urbem suam perducendam curavit

Imperator Caesar Marcus Aurelius Antoninus Pius Felix Augustus, Parthicus Maximus, Britannicus Maximus, brought in his city the Aqua Marcia obstructed by several impediments, after cleaning the source, cutting and punching mountains, restoring the path, and having provided the new source Antoniniana.

On the lower channel of Aqua Marcia there is an inscription about the restoration by Emperor Titus in 79:

TITUS CAESAR DIVI F(ilius) VESPASIANUS AUG(ustus) PONTIF(ex) MAX(imus) TRIBUNICIAE POTESTAT(is) IX IMPerator) XV CENS(or) CO(n)S(ul) VII DESIG(natus) IIX P(ater) P(atriae) RIVOM AQUAE MARCIAE VETUSTATE DILAPSUM REFECIT ET AQUAM QUAE IN USU ESSE DESIERAT REDUXIT

Imperator Titus Caesar, son of the divine Vespasianus Augustus, pontifex maximus, tribune of the plebs for the ninth time, imperator for the fifteenth time, censor, consul for the seventh time, (consul) chosen for the eighth time, pater patriae, restored the channels of the Aqua Marcia destroyed by the time, and restored back the water that was no longer used.

== Nearby notable roads ==
- Via Tiburtina linking Porta Tiburtina with Campo Verano cemetery.
- Via Volsci, running parallel to Via Tiburtina

== See also ==
- Porta Ardeatina – Gate in the Aurelian Walls of Rome, Italy

== Notes ==
Preceded by Porta Settimiana	Landmarks of Rome; Porta Tiburtina	Succeeded by Porta Cavalleggeri
