= Porta San Pancrazio =

Gate of the Aurelian Walls, a landmark of Rome, Italy

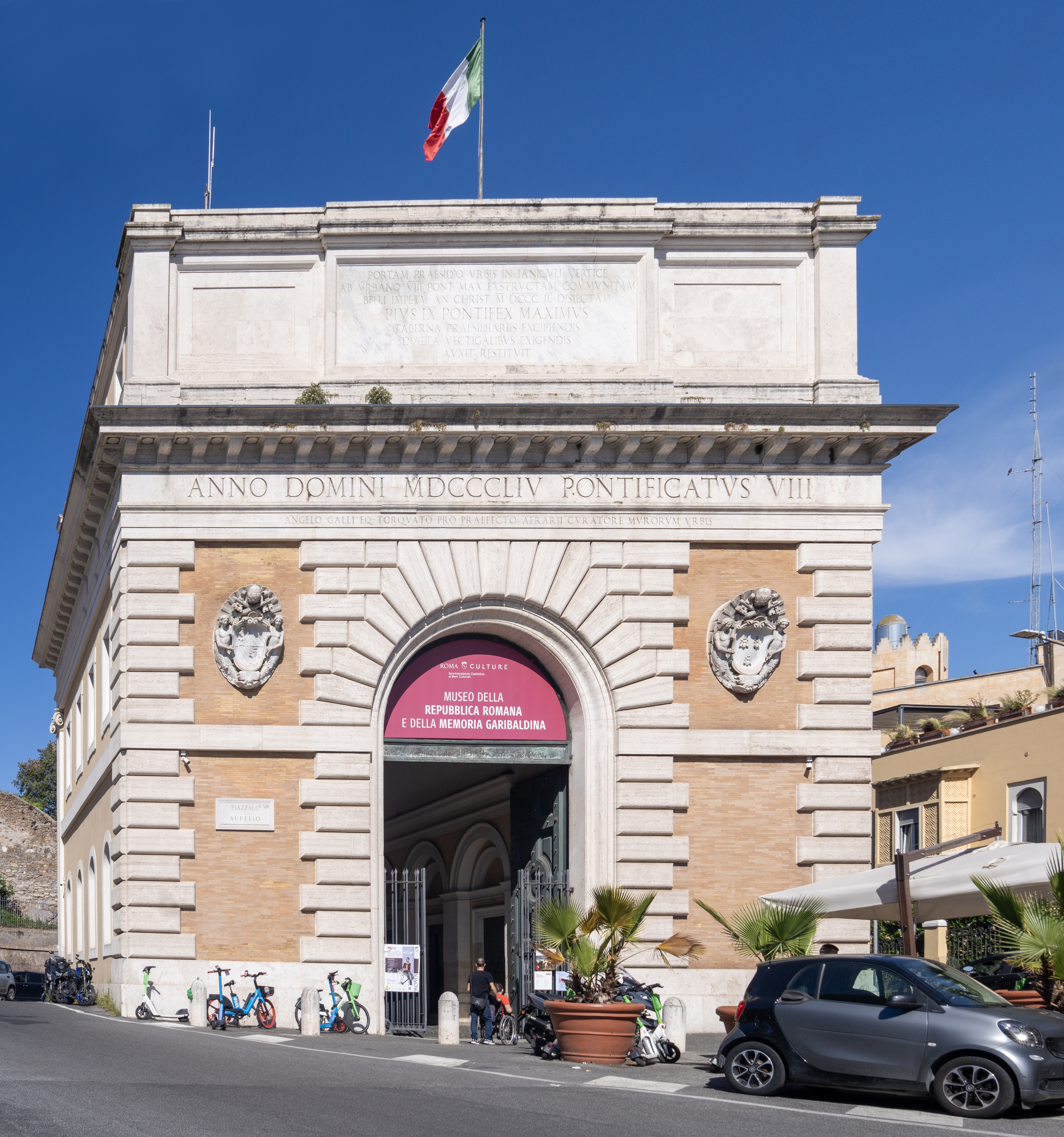
- Porta San Pancrazio, inner side

- Location within Rome
- Interactive map of Porta San Pancrazio
- 41°53′18.4″N 12°27′41.4″E
- Location: Rome

Porta San Pancrazio is one of the southern gates of the Aurelian Walls in Rome, Italy.

The gate houses the National Association of Garibaldi Veterans and Survivors along with the Garibaldi Museum (also dedicated to the Italian Partisan Division "Garibaldi", operating between 1943 and 1945).

== History ==
The gate rises close to the summit of the Janiculum hill and its first building could date back to the end of the Roman Republic, when a humble housing cluster on the right bank of the Tiber was surrounded by a little urban wall. It later marked the southern vertex of the stretch of the wall, built in 270 by Emperor Aurelian, that climbed the hill with a triangle-shaped layout.

One of the relevant characteristics of the 14th Region, where the gate rose, was that Via Aurelia vetus passed through it: the street started from Pons Aemilius, climbed the hill and exited from the town just through the gate, that took its name from the street (even now, the present Via Aurelia Antica, having lost its stretch within Trastevere, starts here). For this reason, the former name of the gate was Porta Aurelia, though the denominations "Gianicolense" or "Aureliana" – from the name of the consul that conceived and built the road – are attested. The importance of the near sepulchre of the Christian martyr Pancras, of the catacomb consecrated to him and later of the Basilica, destinations of continual pilgrimages, became so much prevalent along the consular street, as to influence, just like in many other cases, the process of Christianization of the nomenclature of the Roman gates, and since the 6th century the gate was bestowed the name it maintains to this day.

In the vicinity, on the inner side, there were the public mills, placed close to the merge of the aqueduct called Aqua Traiana, which operated until the end of the Middle Ages.

The original aspect of the gate is absolutely unknown and probably it also rose in a slightly different position. Some clues dating back to 16th and 17th century might lead to suppose that it had a single arch with two quadrangular towers on its sides, thus confirming the typical structure of all the restorations carried up by Emperor Honorius at the beginning of the 5th century.

In February 537, it was reported that the gate was taken by the besieging Goths led by Vitiges. This report was later determined to be a false alarm by Belisarius.

The whole gate was partially rebuilt in the 17th century by Mattia de Rossi, a disciple of Gian Lorenzo Bernini, during the construction of the new urban wall called Mura Gianicolensi (Janiculum walls), by orders of Pope Urban VIII. De Rossi simply removed the gate, but maintained the Aurelian counter-gate. The new walls replaced, by demolishing it, the whole stretch of Aurelian walls rising on the right side of the Tiber, as well as Porta Portese and Porta San Pancrazio, that were completely re-built (the first one became the present Porta Portese, about 400 m further north than the former position), with the Baroque architectural style typical of that age.

The gate became later famous for the combats that took place in the area, in the period April – June 1849, between the military units of the Roman Republic, captained by Giuseppe Garibaldi, and the French troops intervened to protect the Papacy. On that occasion the gate was destroyed by French bombings. It was rebuilt to its present aspect by the architect Virginio Vespignani in 1854, on commission by Pope Pius IX, and had once again a prominent role on September 20, 1870, when it was passed through by the troops of General Nino Bixio, at the same time of the one entering Porta Pia.

On the occasion of the 19th-century rehash, the following inscription was placed on the attic:

PORTAM PRAESIDIO URBIS IN IANICULO VERTICE
AB URBANO VIII PONT. MAX. EXTRUCTAM COMMUNITAM
BELLI IMPETU AN. CHRIST. MDCCCLIV DISIECTAM
PIUS IX PONT. MAXIMUS
TABERNA PRAESIDIARIS EXCEPIENDIS
DIAETA VECTIGALIBUS EXIGENDIS
RESTITUIT
ANNO DOMINI MDCCCLIV PONTIFICATUS VIII
ANGELI GALLI EQ TORQUATO PRAEFECTO AERARII CURATORI

(Pope Pius IX rebuilt in the year 1854, the seventh of his own pontificate, as a dwelling to host the soldiers of the garrison and as a pavilion to cash the duties in, the fortified gate built for the defense of the town at the top of Janiculum by Pope Urban VIII, destroyed by the impetus of war in 1854 – curator A.G. Torquato treasury prefect.)

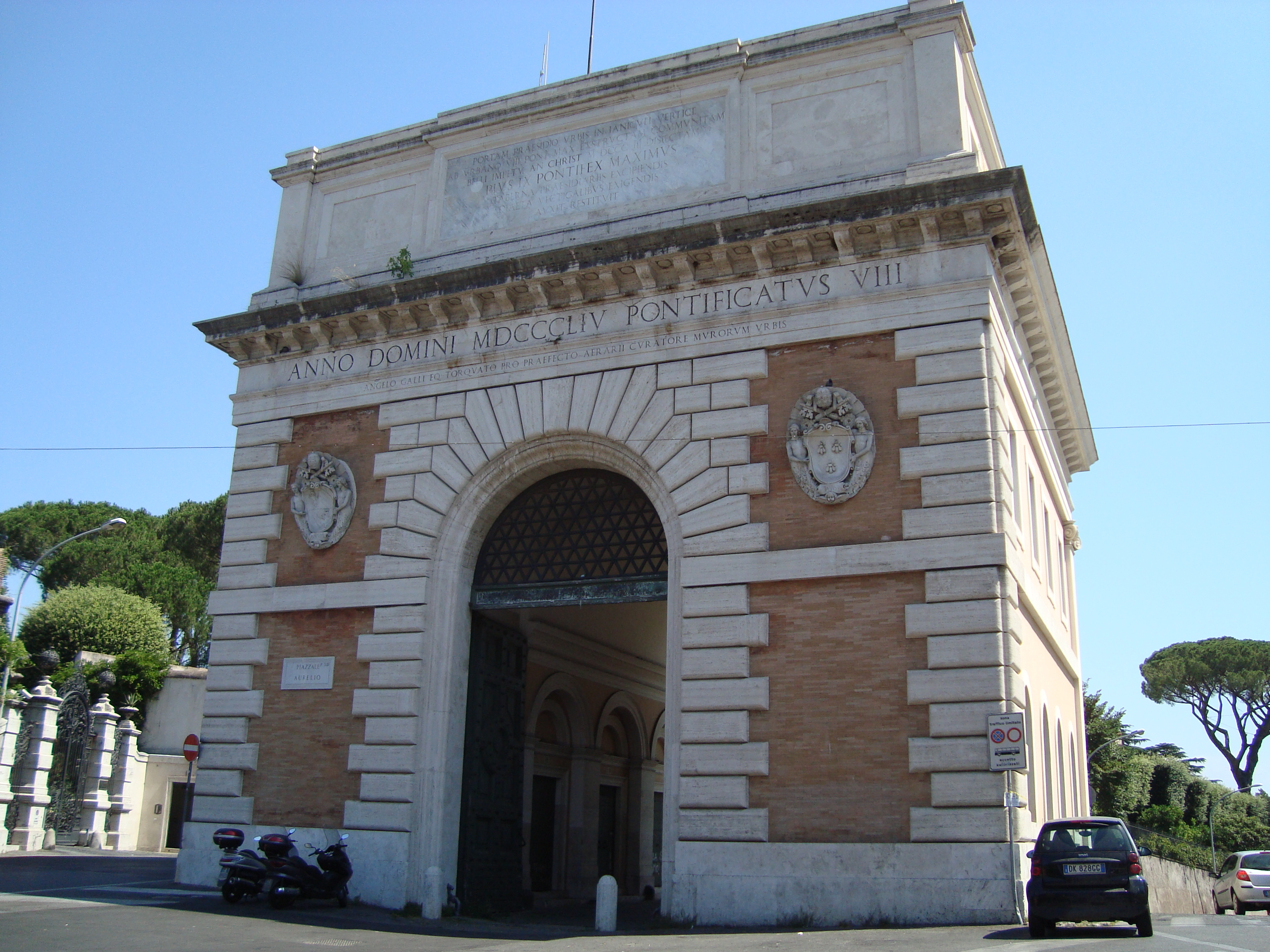
Porta San Pancrazio, outer side

Porta San Pancrazio in the 18th century(etching by Giuseppe Vasi)

In effect the structure housed both the rooms of the military garrison (the taberna) and the office for the collection of the passage toll (vectigalibus exigendis).

With regards to this, it is worth mentioning that since the 5th and at least until the 15th century, the wall gates and the collection of the toll were farmed out or sold to private citizens as a normal practice. A document dated 1467 reports an announcement that specifies the modalities for the auction sale of the city gates for a one-year term. Another document, dated 1474, states that the tender price of Porta San Pancrazio was "florins 25, bol. XXI per sextaria" ("semestral instalment"); it is a quite moderate price, therefore the urban traffic through that gate should be moderate too. Two tenders concerning Porta San Pancrazio during the 15th century are documented, as well as another one, granted in 1566 by Pope Pius V to his nephew Lorenzo Giberti.

The toll was usually disciplined by precise tables, concerning the charge for whichever kind of goods, but it was continually rounded off by different kinds of infringements, as proved by several edicts against this custom.

== See also ==
- Porta San Paolo – Gate of the Aurelian walls, a landmark of Rome, Italy

== Sources ==
- Mauro Quercioli, Le mura e le porte di Roma. Newton Compton Ed., Rome, 1982
- Laura G. Cozzi, Le porte di Roma. F.Spinosi Ed., Rome, 1968
- Giuseppina Pisani Sartorio, s.v. Porta Aurelia, P. S. Pancratii, in Lexicon Topographicum Urbis Romae (by E.M. Steinby), III, Rome 1996, p. 302. ISBN 88-7140-096-8

Preceded by Porta Portese	Landmarks of Rome; Porta San Pancrazio	Succeeded by Porta San Paolo
