= Via Asinaria =

Roman road

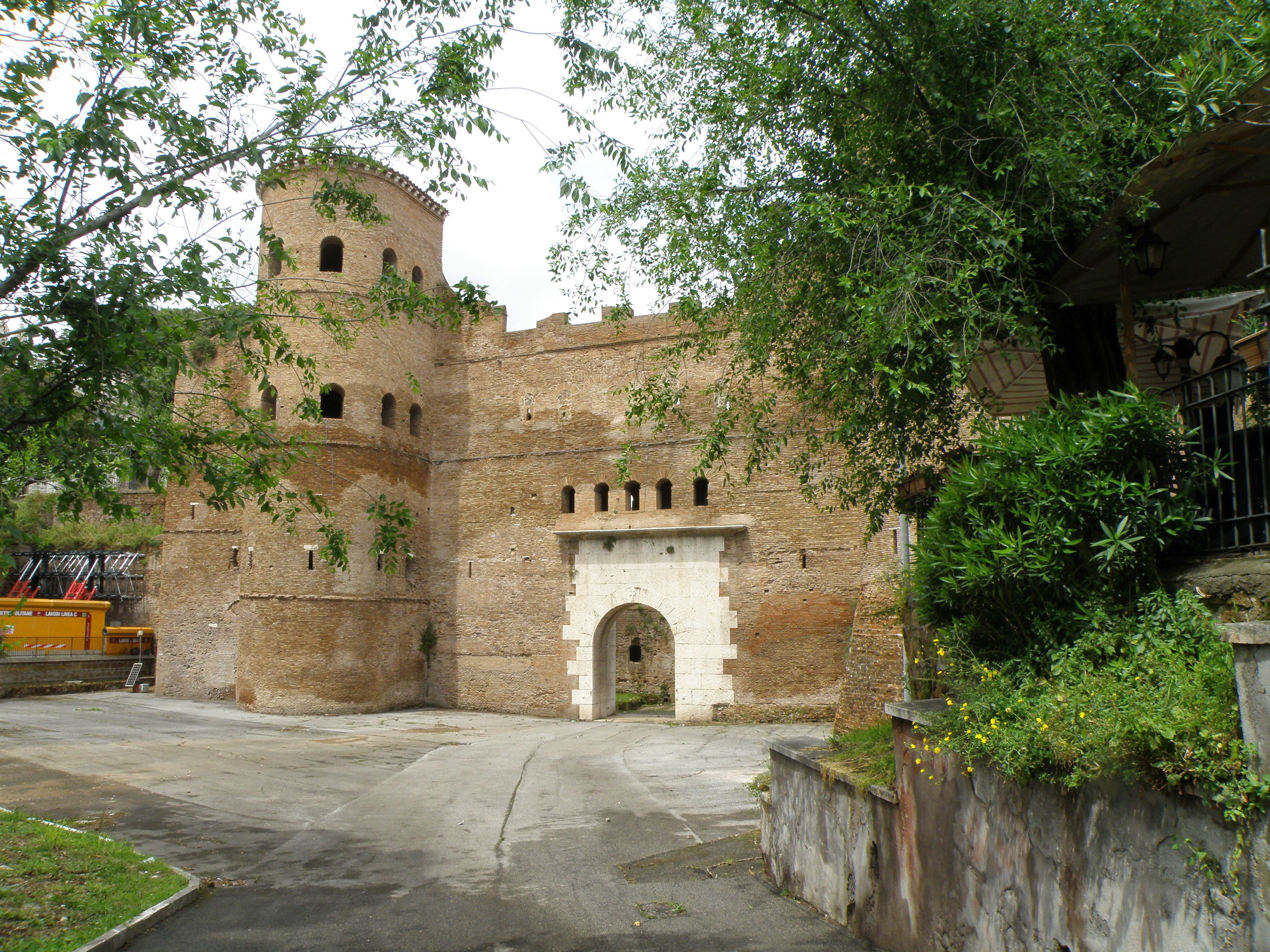
- Porta Asinaria
- Type: Roman road
- Location: Rome

Via Asinaria was an ancient Roman road that started from Porta Asinaria in the Aurelian Walls (Rome). It was somehow connected with the Via Latina, as it is reported that Belisarius, during its advance on Rome, left the Via Latina to enter the city from Porta Asinaria; the latter was considered one of the main accesses for those coming from the south, as in ancient times the 17th-century Porta San Giovanni didn't exist.

Via Asinaria is mentioned by Rufus Festus, who, in one passage, places it between Via Ardeatina and Via Latina. The historian therefore suggests that its route, starting from Porta Asinaria to the east of Via Latina, had to cross the latter, since Via Ardeatina is west of Via Latina, on the other side of the urban gate.
The actual route is still debated among historians, but probably the initial stretch on the outskirts of Rome coincides with that of the present Via Appia Nuova.

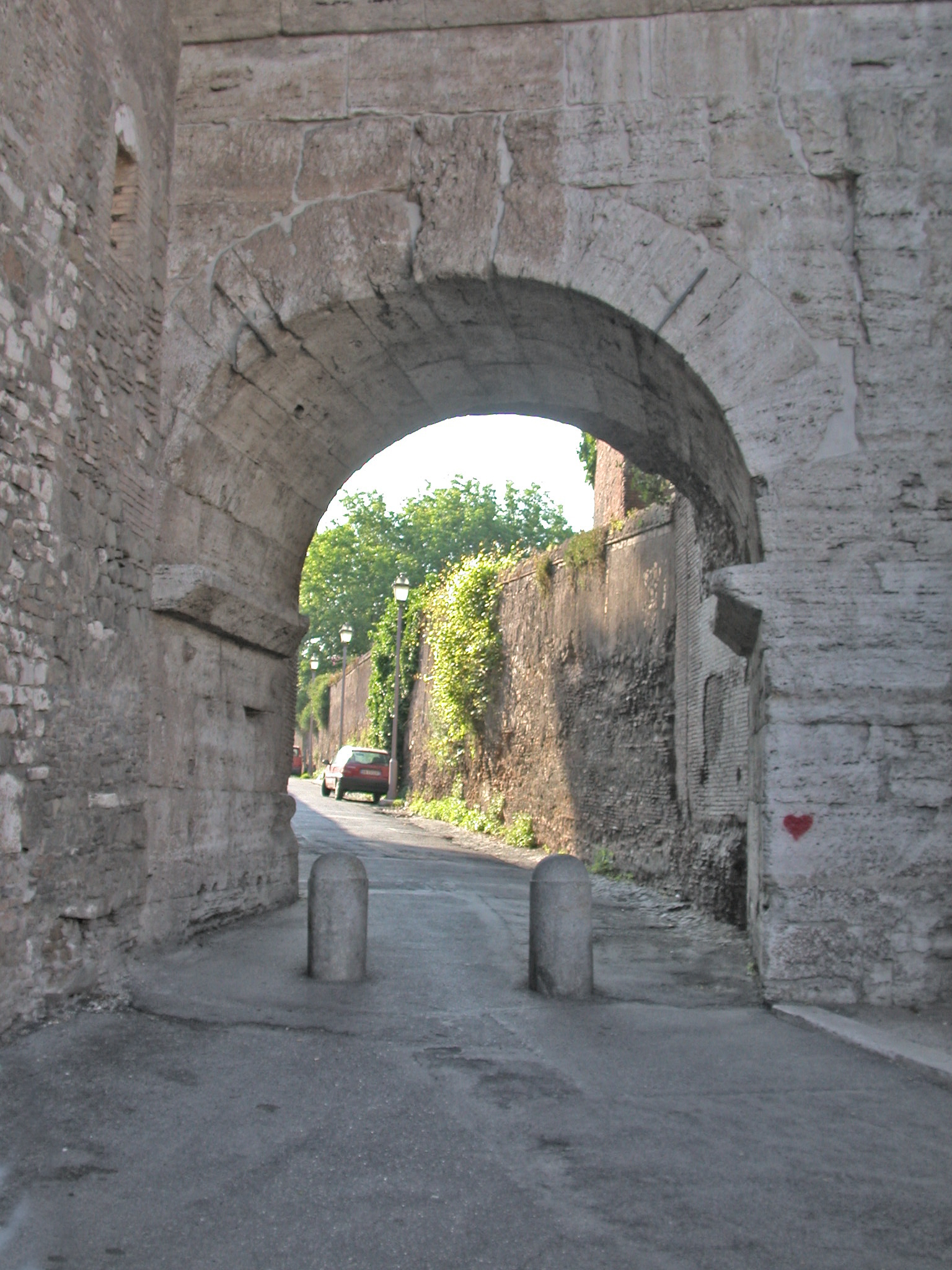
Porta Caelimontana (Arch of Dolabella and Silanus), that Nibby indicates as the starting point of Via Asinaria.

Antonio Nibby (op. cit. P. 587) believes that it started from Porta Caelimontana in the Servian Wall.

Porta Latina is closed nowadays, so Via Latina is interrupted at this point: nonetheless, it can be reached by walking out Porta Appia and going along the [Aurelian] walls. You pass two modern rural houses, leaving them on the left, and about 1 mile outside Porta Capena you meet an ancient road, which crosses Via Latina coming from the present Porta San Giovanni, and descends to the valley commonly known as Egeria's: this is Via Asinaria, which formerly came out of Porta Caelimontana, and then of Porta Asinaria, and was a road that linked Via Latina, Via Appia and Via Ardeatina together, as can be read in Festus's entry Retricibus, and which certainly was not named after the donkeys, which were loaded with herbs, as the authors of past centuries, who wrote about the antiquities of Rome, believed or rather imagined, but for another cause, now unknown, and probably from the name or surname of those who built it. For the gens Asinia was counted among the most illustrious of Rome, and the name of Cajus Asinius Pollio will be famous forever.

Giuseppe Lugli reaffirmed its route through Porta Caelimontana and Porta Asinaria and considered it a service road, intended to transversely connect the groups of villae "between Via Ardeatina, Via Appia, Via Castrimeniese and perhaps also Via Latina, until it reconnected with the latter in the estate called Roma Vecchia".

== Bibliography ==
- Via Asinaria in Platner & Ashby, A Topographical Dictionary of Ancient Rome.
- Antonio Nibby, Analisi storico-topografico-antiquaria della carta de'dintorni di Roma tomo III, Rome 1837
