= Porta Metronia =

Gate of the Aurelian walls, a landmark of Rome, Italy

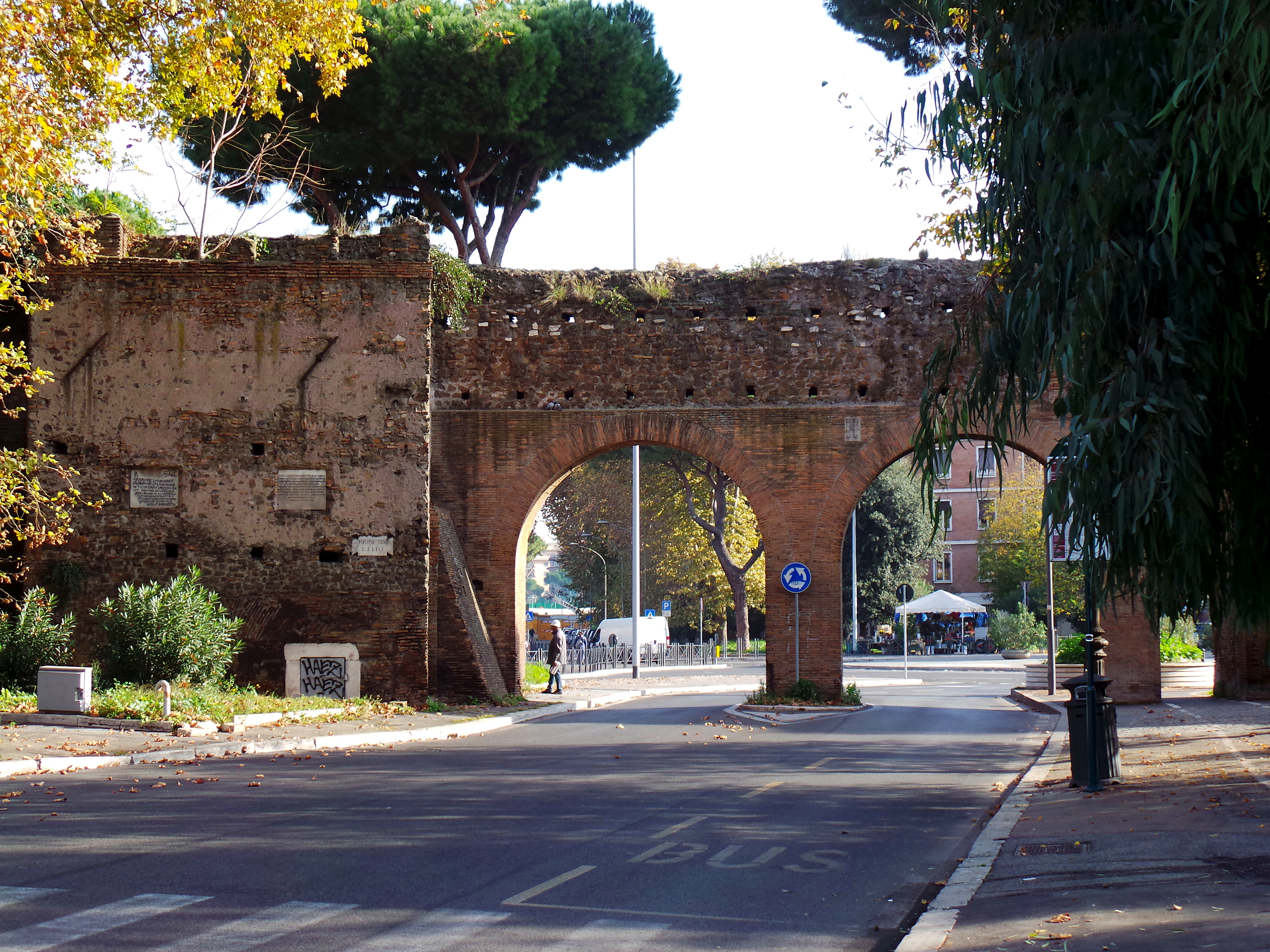

- Location within Rome
- Interactive map of Porta Metronia
- 41°52′55.69″N 12°29′55.33″E
- Location: Rome

Porta Metronia is a gate in the third-century Aurelian Walls of Rome, Italy. The gate is located in the southern section of the wall between Porta San Giovanni to the east and Porta Latina to the south.

During the tenth century, beyond this gate was marshland called the Prata Decii or the Decenniae. At the end of the Middle Ages, the gate was closed and the entrance bricked up.

Because of increasing traffic in the modern era, four main passages were created beside the original gate. The ground level around the gate has risen significantly through the ages, leaving the original passage partially underground.

== See also ==
- Porta Nomentana – Gate of the Aurelian walls, a landmark of Rome, Italy
- List of ancient monuments in Rome

== Notes ==
Preceded by Porta Latina	Landmarks of Rome; Porta Metronia	Succeeded by Porta Nomentana
