= Porta Nomentana =

Gate of the Aurelian walls, a landmark of Rome, Italy

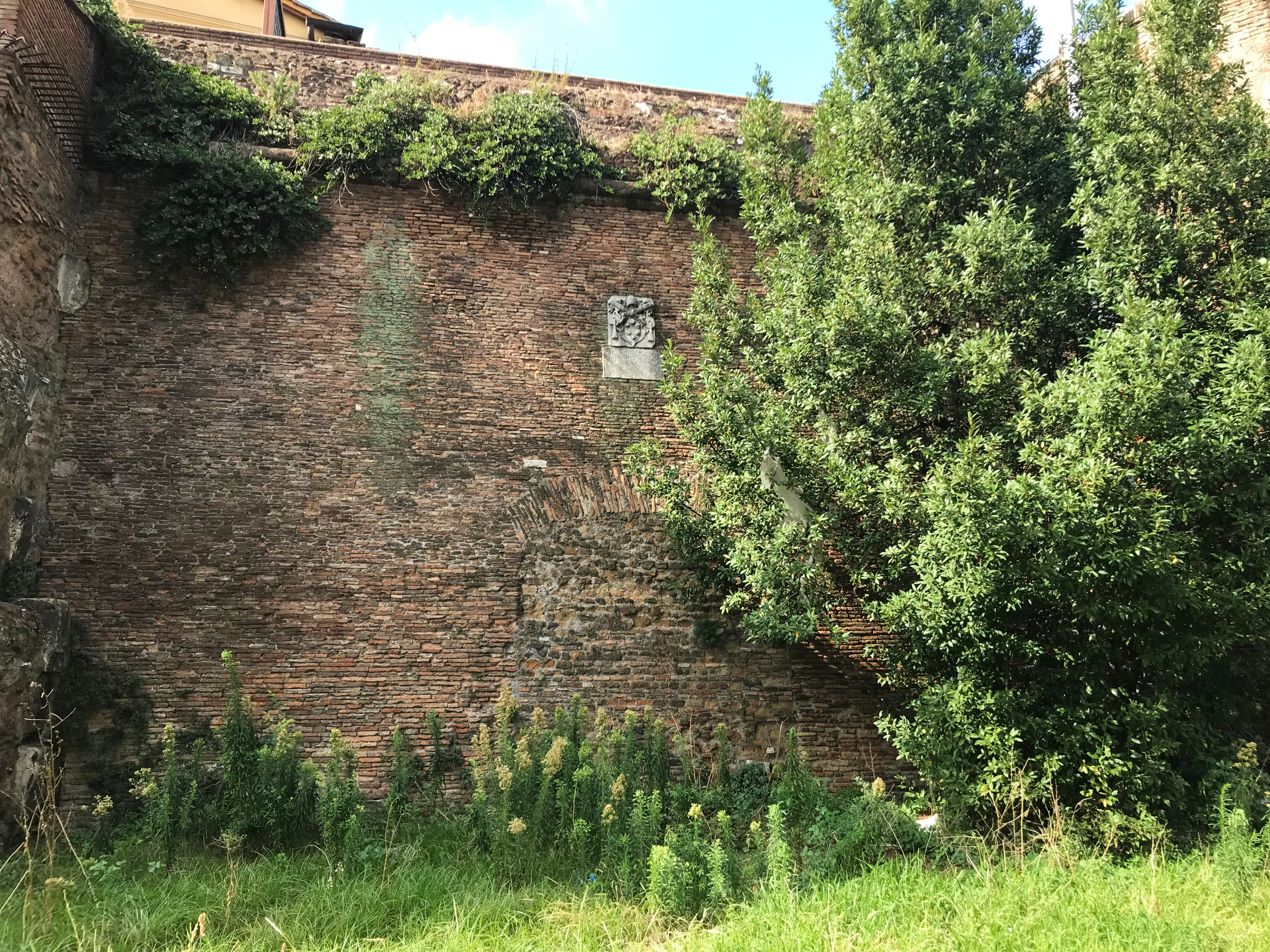
- The sealed Porta Nomentana

- Location within Rome
- Interactive map of Porta Nomentana
- 41°54′31″N 12°30′07″E

The Porta Nomentana was one of the gates in the Aurelian Walls of Rome, Italy. It is located along viale del Policlinico, around 70 m east of Porta Pia. It is now blocked and merely a boundary wall for the British Embassy.

== History ==
It was built as a single-arch gate between 270 and 273 AD by the emperor Aurelian. Its original right-hand semicircular tower (on quadrato foundations) is still to be seen, while its left-hand one incorporated a tomb, presumed to belong to Quintus Aterius, a famous orator at the court of Tiberius, called by Tacitus "an old man made rotten by flattery" (senex foedissimae adulationis) and mentioned by him as the first to get up to refute Tiberius's feigned refusal of the imperial crown.

Marble from that tomb was used to cover the gate in restorations by Honorius in 403, who at the same time blocked the two nearby posterns in the direction of Castra Praetoria and restored the porta Salaria. Unlike the nearby Via Salaria, the via Nomentana, which led to Nomentum (the modern Mentana), was of minor importance.

In the Medieval period, the gate was once known as the Gate of St Agnes because it led to the Basilica of Sant'Agnese. It also was referred to as Porta de Domina or Domnae.

A document of 1474 cites the price for the Porta Nomentana (called Porta La Donna), equal to the low price of fiorini 24, soll. 47 per sextaria (paid in semi-annual installment).

It was converted into a two-arch gate by Pope Pius IV in 1564 (as described in a papal inscription on the gate), the same year as it was replaced by Porta Pia as the access route to the via Nomentana. This phase's brick arch, topped by the papal arms, and the original right-hand semicircular tower (with quadrato foundations) are still to be seen. Ten years later, the Porta Asinaria also closed to be replaced by the new Porta San Giovanni. The original 3rd-century left-hand tower was demolished in 1827 to excavate the 1st-century AD tomb built into it (previous to the gate the area had been outside the city centre and thinly populated, and thus ideal for a cemetery).

== See also ==
- Porta Pia – Gate of the Aurelian walls, a landmark of Rome, Italy
- Ponte Nomentano – Ancient Roman bridge in Rome

== Sources ==
- Quercioli, Mauro (2005). Le mura e le porte di Roma. Rome: Newton & Compton.
- Cozzi, Laura G. (1968). Le porte di Roma. Rome: F. Spinosi.

Preceded by Porta Metronia	Landmarks of Rome; Porta Nomentana	Succeeded by Porta Pia
