= San Giovanni (Rome Metro) =

Rome metro station

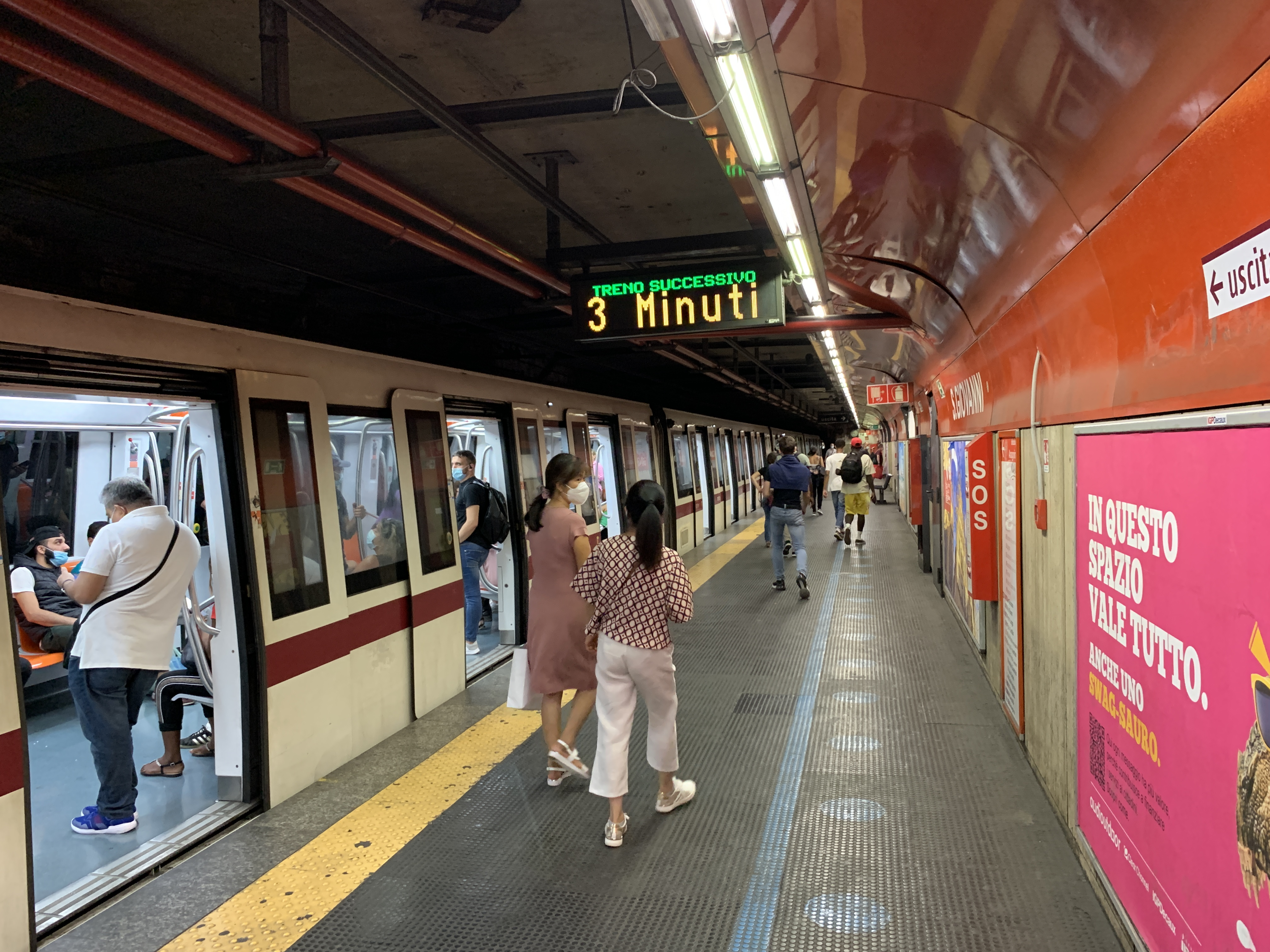
- Line A platform

General information
- Coordinates: 41°53′07″N 12°30′34″E
- Owner: ATAC
- Platforms: Island platform (Line A); Side platform (Line C)
- Tracks: 2 (Line A); 2 (Line C)

Construction
- Structure type: Underground

History
- Opened: 1980; 46 years ago

Services
Preceding station	Rome Metro	Following station
Manzoni towards Battistini	Line A	Re di Roma towards Anagnina
Porta Metronia towards Colosseo	Line C	Lodi towards Monte Compatri-Pantano
Location
- Click on the map to see marker

San Giovanni is an underground interchange station on Lines A and C of the Rome Metro.

The station is located in Piazzale Appio at the beginning of Via Appia Nuova, beside the Basilica di San Giovanni in Laterano, from which the station takes its name.

It opened in 1980 on Line A. On 12 May 2018, Line C was extended to the station. Until 16 December 2025, when Line C was further extended to Colosseo, San Giovanni station served as the westernmost terminus of Line C.

San Giovanni is the first stop on the Rome Metro which is part of the Archeostation circuit. Archaeological finds discovered during the works of the new Line C are exhibited inside the stations.

== Located nearby ==
- Lateran Palace
- Basilica of St. John Lateran
- Santa Croce in Gerusalemme
- Porta San Giovanni
- Porta Asinaria

== Interchanges ==
- Interchange station for Line A and Line C on the Rome Metro.
- 3 (Tram Line) - 16 - 51 - 77 - 81 - 85 - 87 - 218 - 360 - 665 - 792 (ATAC Bus Network) - NMA - NMC - N3S (ATAC Night Bus lines)

== Gallery ==
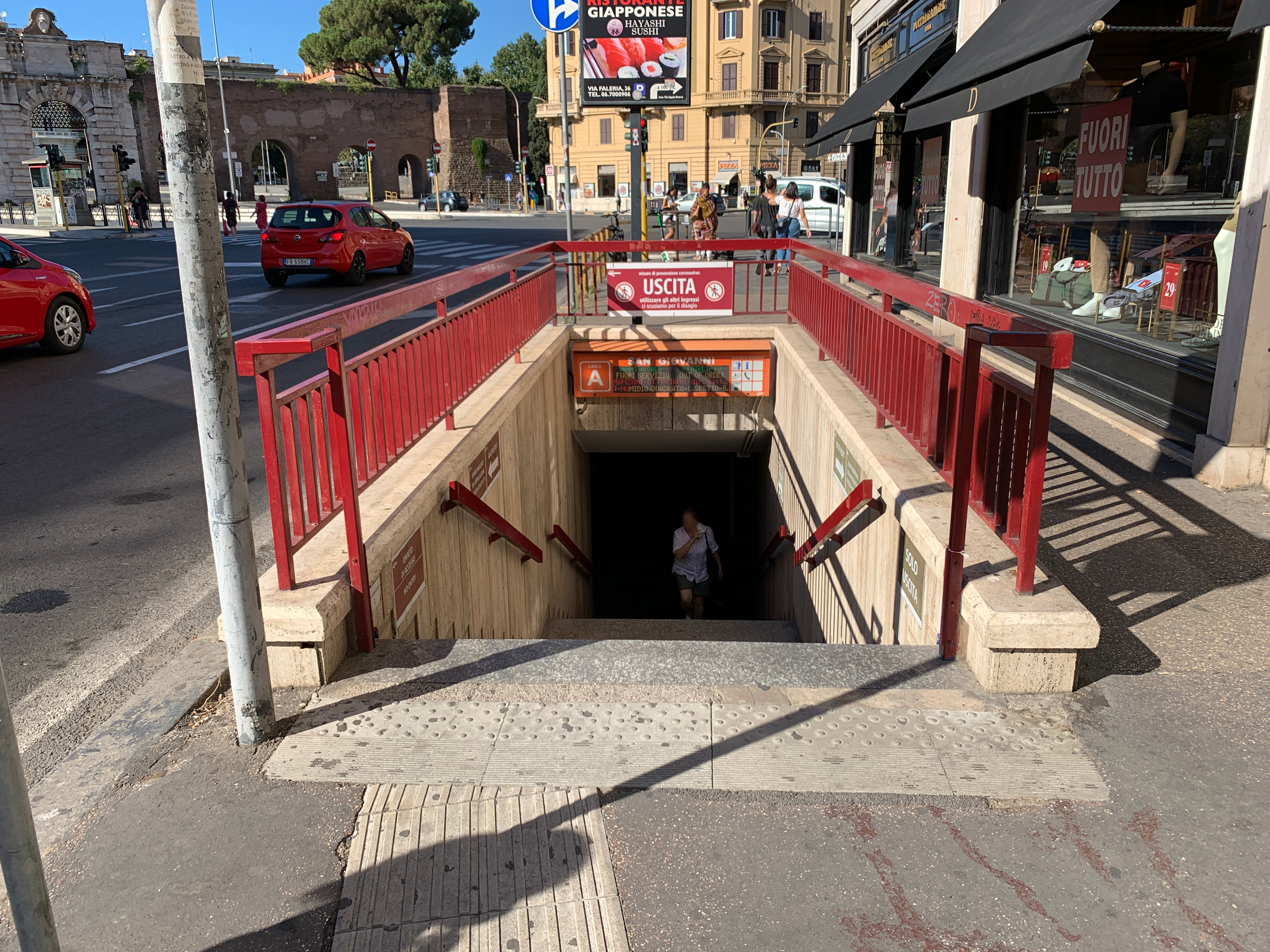
The entrance from Piazzale Appio with Porta San Giovanni at the back

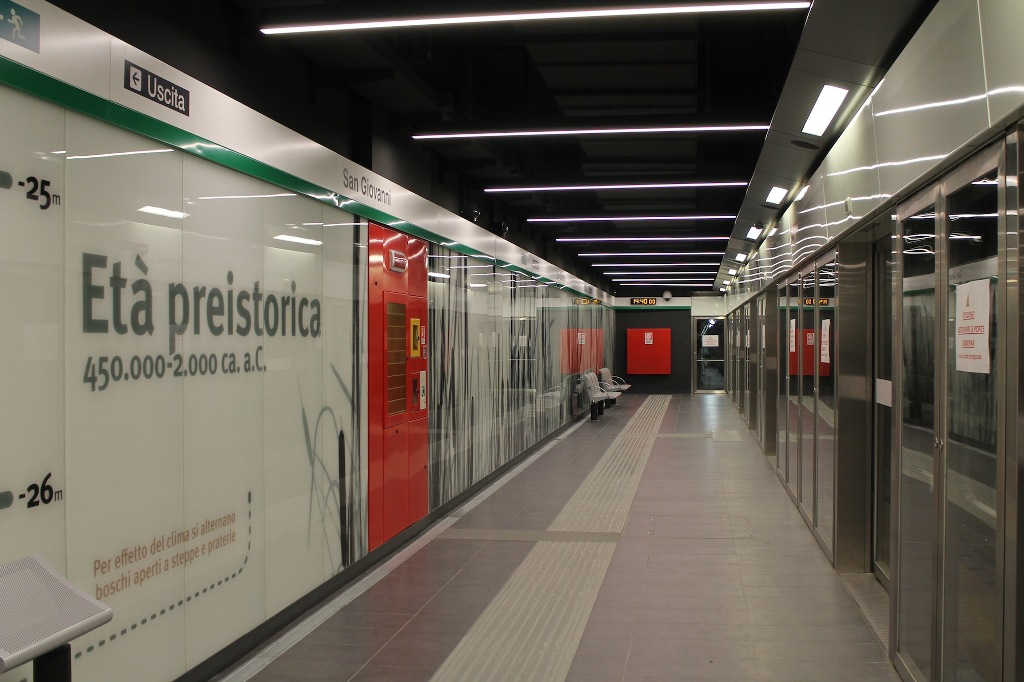
The platform level of the C line station

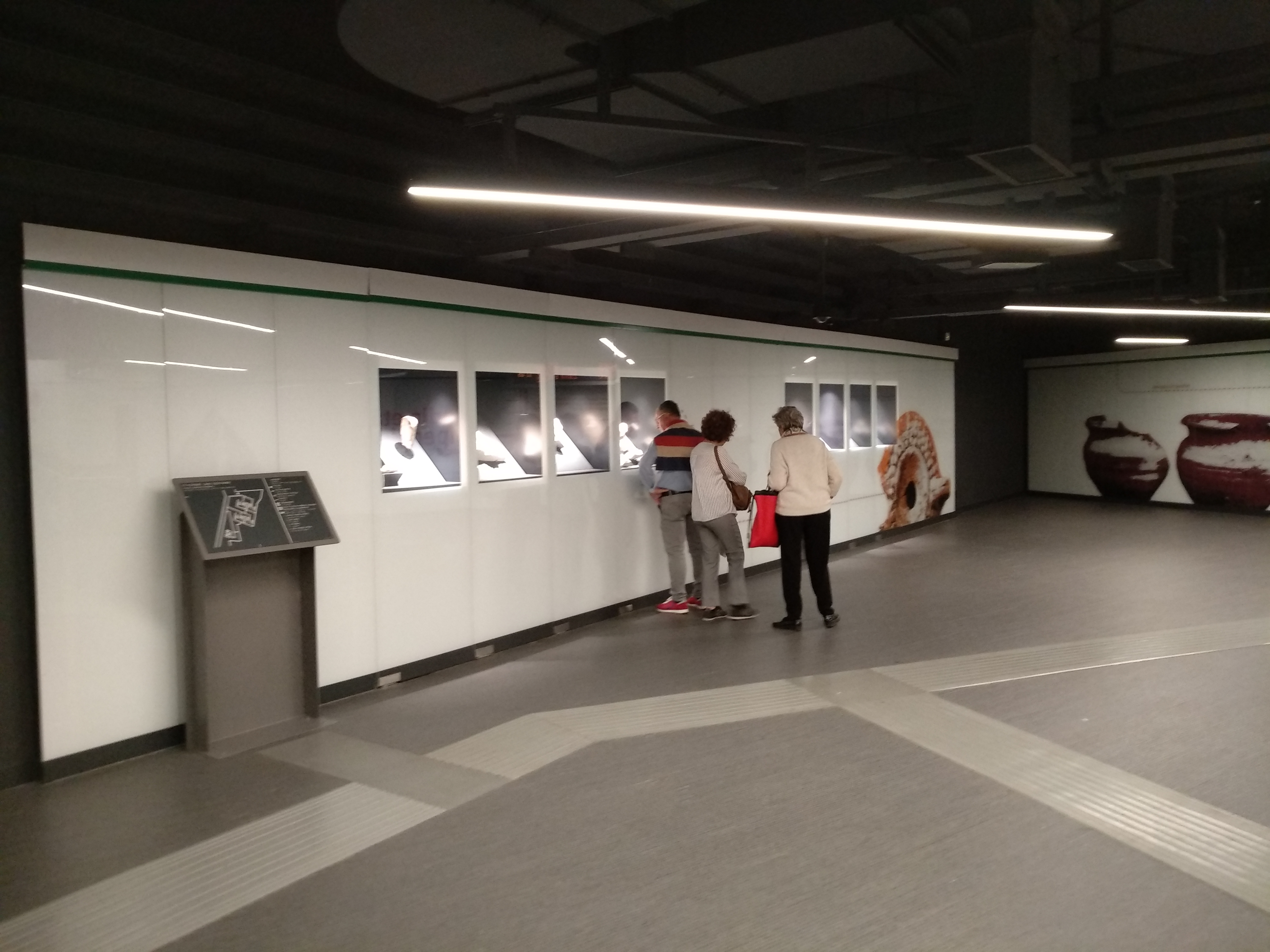
Part of the station museum
