= Museo delle Mura =

Archaeological museum in Rome, Italy

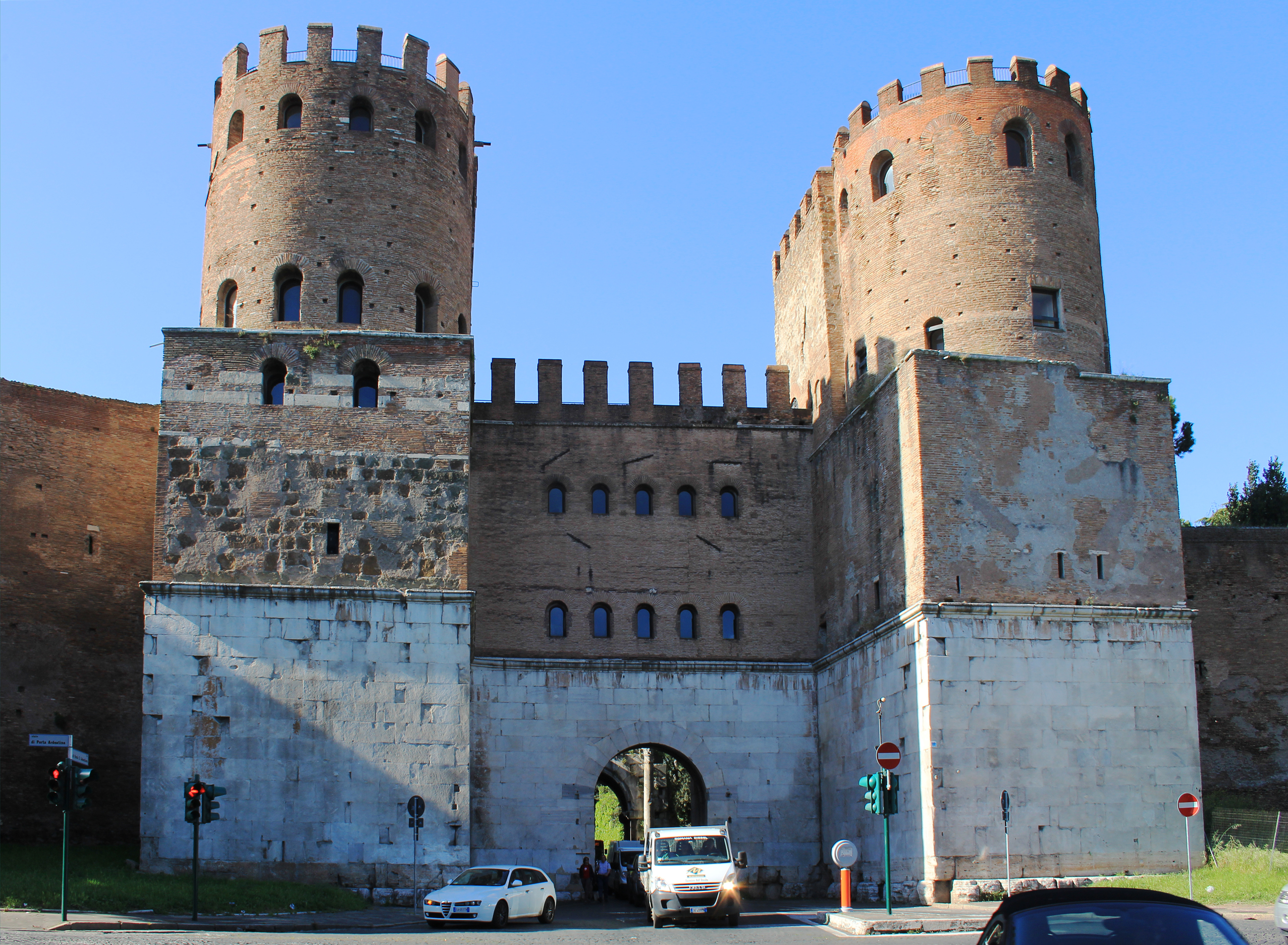
- Porta San Sebastiano, home of the museum
- Click on the map for a fullscreen view
- Established: 1990
- Location: Via di Porta San Sebastiano, 18
- Coordinates: 41°52′24″N 12°30′05″E
- Type: Archaeological museum
- Website: museodellemuraroma.it

The Museo delle Mura ("museum of the walls") is an archaeological museum in Rome, the capital of Italy. It is housed on two floors of the Porta San Sebastiano, at the start of the Appian Way. Exhibits document the history and techniques of construction of the various walls of Rome from the Kingdom of Rome to the modern era; a section of the Aurelian Wall is open to visitors. Admission is free.

== History ==
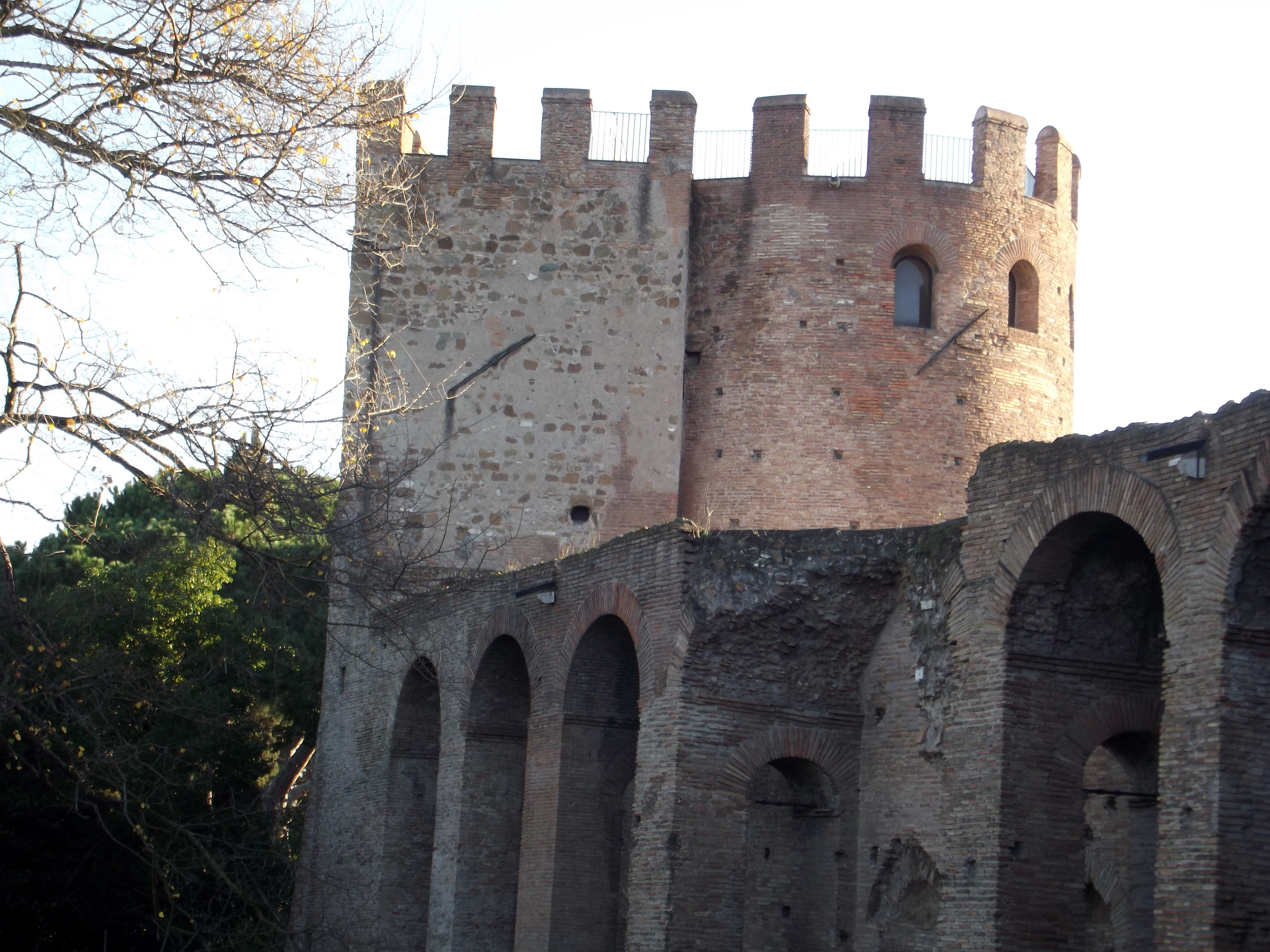
View from the walkway accessed through the museum

The museum in its present form, was officially opened in 1990. Prior to 1939, the Porta San Sebastiano (also known as the Porta Appia) had been open to the public but it was then taken over by Ettore Muti, the Secretary of the Italian Fascist Party. White-and-black mosaics in some rooms date back to that time. From 1970, there was a small museum connected to the internal parapet of the Aurelian Wall but this museum was only open to the public on Sundays, and, after a few years, was closed.

== Exhibition ==
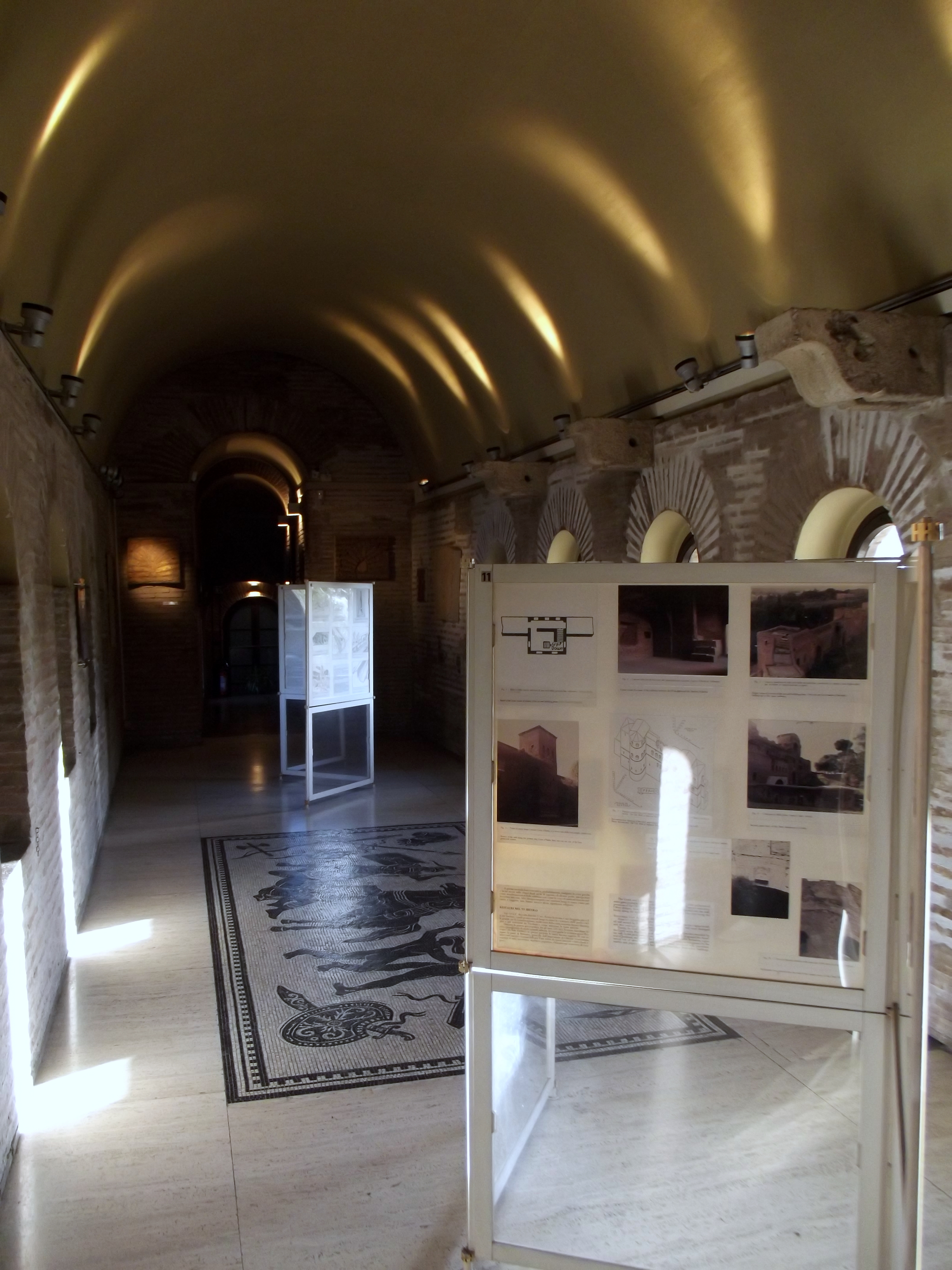
Sala II, the second room of the museum

The museum provides a detailed history of wall construction in Rome and the surrounding areas, with information going back to one constructed in Ardea to the southeast of Rome in the 8th century. It describes the construction methods of the first Roman wall, built by Servius Tullius the legendary sixth king of Rome, the second wall constructed in the 4th century BC after invasion of Rome by the Gauls, and the Aurelian Walls, constructed in the 3rd century AD, as well as subsequent work to raise the height of those walls and improve defences, and more recent additions and changes up to the 20th century. In addition to text and diagrams, some models of walls are provided.

== The rooms ==
- Room 1

This is a reception room, in the west tower of the Gate. It can be used for video projections. The room has one of the Fascist era mosaics showing a tiger ambushing two deer.

- Room 2

This occupies the first floor, standing over the arch of the Porta S. Sebastiano. There are informative panels about the earliest walls and the subsequent Aurelian Walls. The construction of the Aurelian walls was the largest building project that had taken place in Rome for some time, and their construction was a statement of the continued strength of Rome. The exhibits explain the events that necessitated their construction, and the reasons for the choice of the path followed. The panels also describe the building techniques and the types of gate. There is also a panel dedicated to military equipment used both by defenders and attackers.

- Room 3

This room, in the east tower, has models of walls and a topographic plan of ancient Rome and the routes of the first three walls.

- Room 4

This room provides information about the Ports San Sebastiano and other gates in the walls of Rome.

- Room 5

The room provides information about the Appian Way, the beginning of which can be seen from the windows.

- Room 6

This discusses developments and restorations up to the present day.

- Room 7

This contains a model of wall fortifications designed by Antonio da Sangallo (1453–1534).

- Terrace and walkway

The terrace of the Porta San Sebastiano can be visited together with a 350-meter stretch of the inside of the Aurelian Wall going west as far as the Via Cristoforo Colombo, in a covered gallery interrupted by ten towers. Remains of the original flooring can be noted. Arrow slits for archers can be seen, as well as staircases inside several of the towers which used to lead to the command rooms. Restoration work can be distinguished by the various types of construction technique. Squared arrow slits from 1848 can also be seen. These were the result of adaptations made to adapt the original slits for artillery.

== See also ==
- Servian Wall

Preceded by Museo delle anime del Purgatorio	Landmarks of Rome; Museo delle Mura	Succeeded by Museo di Roma
