= Porta San Sebastiano =

Gate of the Aurelian walls, a landmark of Rome, Italy

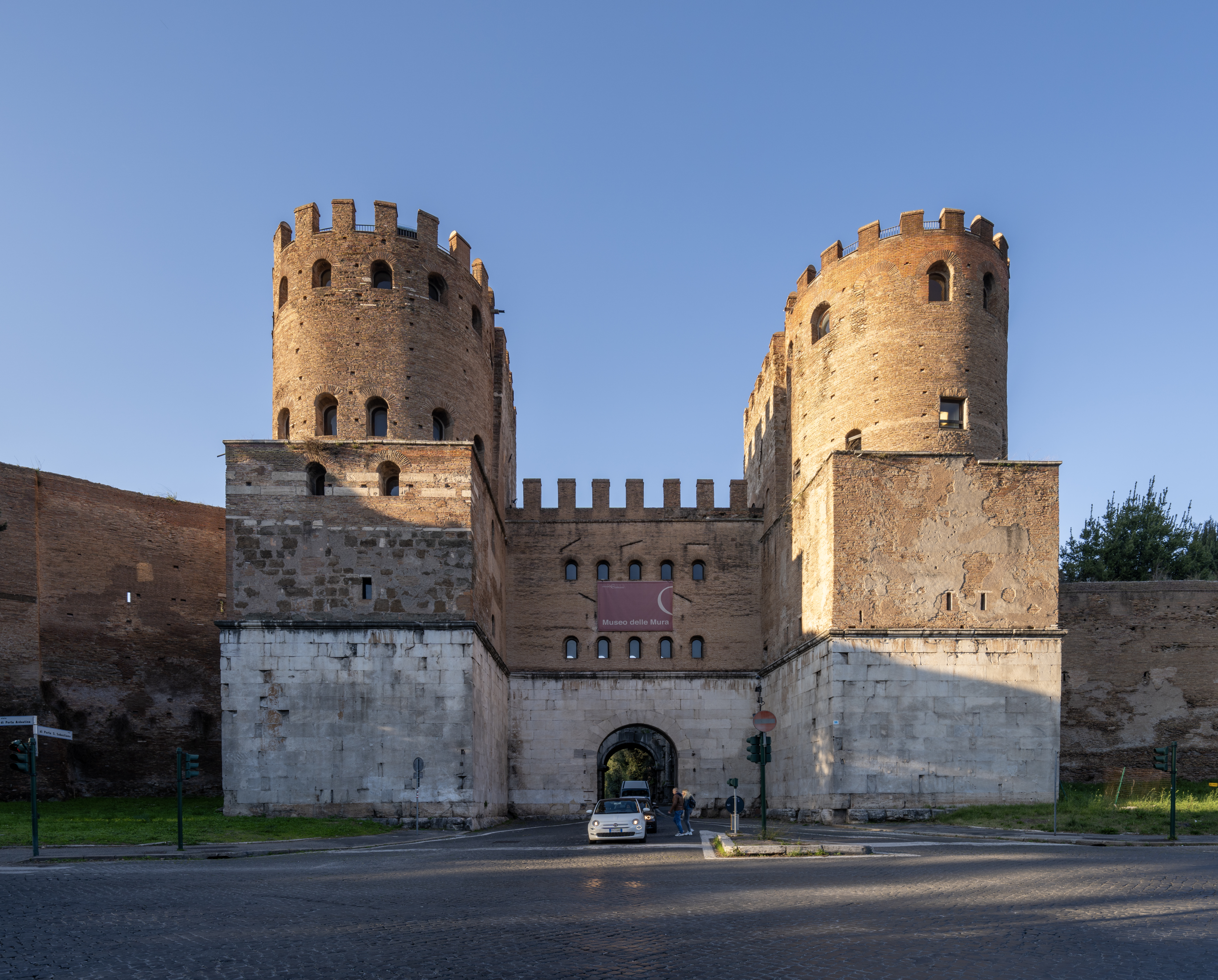
- Porta San Sebastiano

- Location within Rome
- Interactive map of Porta San Sebastiano
- 41°52′25″N 12°30′07″E
- Location: Rome

UNESCO World Heritage Site
- Part of: Via Appia. Regina Viarum
- Criteria: Cultural: iii, iv, vi
- Reference: 1708-001
- Inscription: 2024 (46th Session)

The Porta San Sebastiano is the largest and one of the best-preserved gates in the Aurelian Walls of Rome, Italy. Originally known as the Porta Appia due to its location at the beginning of the Appian Way (Via Appia), the gate served as a key southern entrance to the city since antiquity. It was constructed in the 3rd century AD under the reign of Emperor Aurelian, and later modified during the reign of Honorius. The gate has undergone various restorations over the centuries and now houses the Museum of the Walls (Museo delle Mura).

== History ==
Originally known as the Porta Appia, the gate sat astride the Appian Way, the regina viarum (queen of the roads), which originated at the Porta Capena in the Servian Wall. During the Middle Ages probably it was also called "Accia" (or "Dazza" or "Datia"), a name whose etymology is quite uncertain, but arguably associated with the river Almone, called "Acqua Accia", that flowed nearby. A document ca. AD 1434 calls it Porta Domine quo vadis. The present name is attested only since the second half of 15th century, due to the vicinity to the Basilica of San Sebastiano and its catacombs.

The original structure was constructed by Aurelian ca. AD 275 and included a double-arched opening surmounted by bow windows and two semi-cylindrical towers. The façade was faced with travertine. After a later restoration, the towers were enlarged, increased, and linked, through two parallel walls, to the pre-existing Arch of Drusus.

In AD 401–402 Emperor Honorius reshaped the gate with a single fornix and a higher attic with two rows of six bow windows each; it was also provided with an uncovered chemin de ronde with merlons. The bases of the towers were incorporated within two square-plan platforms, faced with marble. A later modification yielded the gate's present form, in which a floor has been added to the whole structure, towers included. Due to the absence of the usual plate commemorating the works, some archaeologists doubt that the work has not been carried out by Honorius, who left panegyric epigraphs on any other restored part of the walls or the gates.

The latch was released by means of two wooden gates and a shutter that rolled, through still visible grooves, from the control room placed above, whose supporting travertine shelves are still existing. Some notches on the jambs could indicate that wooden beams were also employed to strengthen the latch.

Because of the importance of the Appian Way, that just here entered the town, the whole area was concerned with great traffic movements, especially during ancient Rome. It seems that close to the door there was an area designed for parking of the private means of transport (belonging to high rank personalities which could afford it) that accessed the town from here; it was what now could be defined a "park and ride", since the transit of private means within the town was usually not allowed. This rule probably was effective also for the members of the Imperial family, whose private means were parked in a reserved area (called Mutatorium Caesaris) just a little farther at the beginning of the Appian Way.

Some lumps, still visible on the travertine upholstery in the basis of the monument, are quite interesting: they could be reference marks for the stone cutters. According to historian Antonio Nibby, in the centre of the arch of the gate, on the inner side, there is a carved Greek cross inscribed into a circumference, with an inscription in Greek, dedicated to Saint Conon and Saint George, dating back to 6th-7th century, but today there is no visible trace left.

On the right jamb of the gate there is also a carved figure portraying Archangel Michael killing a drake, alongside of a blackletter inscription written in Medieval Latin, that commemorates the battle fought on 29 September 1327 (the day of Saint Michael) by Roman Ghibelline militiamen of the Colonnas, led by Giacomo de’ Pontani (or Ponziano), against the Guelph army of Robert of Anjou, King of Naples, led by John II and Gaetano Orsini:

ANNO DNI MCCC
XXVII INDICTIONE
XI MENSE SEPTEM
BRIS DIE PENULTIM
A IN FESTO SCI MICHA
ELIS INTRAVIT GENS
FORESTERIA IN URB
E ET FUIT DEBELLA
TA A POPULO ROMA
NO QUI STANTE IA
COBO DE PONTIA
NIS CAPITE REG
IONIS

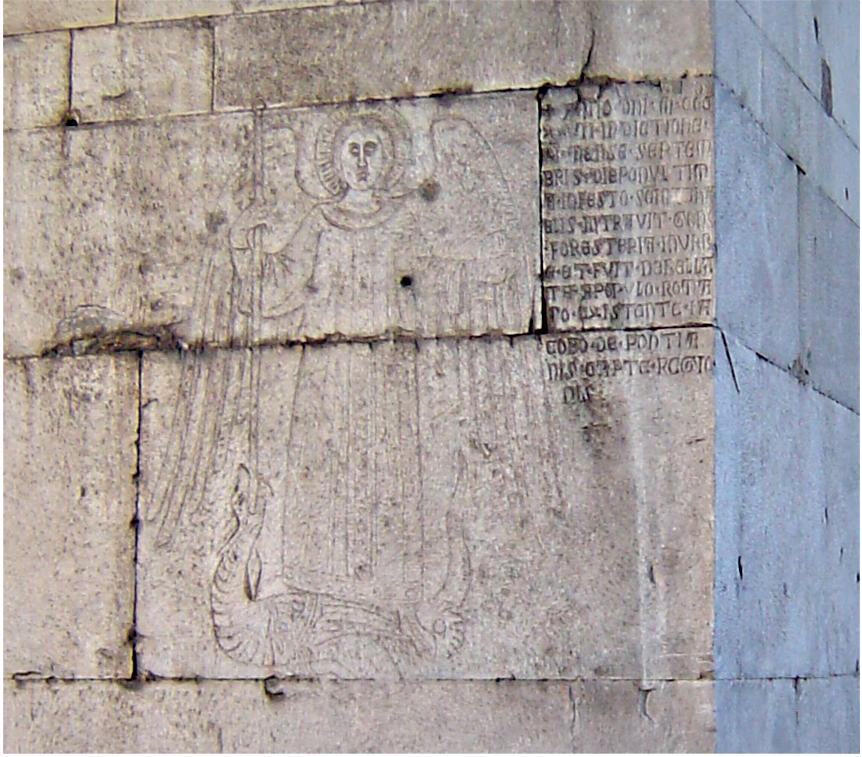
Archangel Michael and the Medieval inscription

In addition to such remains, that are interesting from an historic viewpoint, the whole monument is noteworthy also for the abundance of graffiti traces that, though not official at all, provide evidence of the daily life that occurred around the gate along the centuries. On the left jamb, in front of Archangel Michael, there are several crosses and a christogram (JHS with a cross above the H), probably carved by pilgrims; there are also several Italian and foreign names (a man by the name of Giuseppe Albani wrote his name three times) and dates, that can be deciphered back to 1622; somebody also carved a kind of road direction to Porta San Giovanni or St. John Lateran, addressed to foreign wanderers and still visible just outside the gate, on the left: “DI QUA SI VA A S. GIO…” (Italian for "Hither you go to S. Jo..."), interrupted by something or someone; as well as other signs and writing hard to decipher, such as the engraving “LXXV (underlined three times) DE L”, on the tower on the right.

On 5 April 1536, in preparation for the ceremonial entry of Emperor Charles V into Rome, architect Antonio da Sangallo the Younger transformed the Porta San Sebastiano into a triumphal arch. The gate was embellished with statues, columns, and friezes, and the surrounding area was cleared—through the demolition of earlier structures—to create a processional route leading toward the Roman Forum. The event is commemorated by an inscription above the arch that compares Charles V to Scipio Africanus: "CARLO V ROM. IMP. AUG. III. AFRICANO".

On 4 December 1571, the triumphal procession in honor of Marcantonio Colonna, the winner of the battle of Lepanto, also passed through the gate. The feature of that procession that mostly raised curiosity and interest certainly was the parade of the one hundred and seventy chained Turkish prisoners. On that occasion Pasquino, the famous Roman talking statue, expressed its opinion, but this time without talking: it was primped with the blooding head of a Turk and a sword.

Since the 5th century, and at least until the 15th, the farming out or the sell of town gates and of the toll collection for their transit to private citizens is attested as a usual practice. A document dating back to 1467 reports an announcement specifying the modalities for the auction sale of the town gates for the period of a year. Another document dated 1474 states that the tender price for both Porta Latina and Porta Appia was ”39 florins, 31 solidi, 4 dinars for sextaria” (“biannual payment”); the price was not so high, so the urban traffic through the two gate probably was not excessive as well, though sufficient to guarantee a congruous profit to the purchaser. The profit itself was regulated by detailed tables specifying the charge for each kind of goods, but arguably was rounded off through various kinds of abuses, judging from the number of decrees and threats being issued.

Alongside of the west tower there are remains of a walled-in postern, placed above the ground level, whose peculiarity is the absence of traces of wear on the jambs, just as if it was locked soon after it was built.

As regards the interior, the most relevant changes are recent and date back to 1942–1943, when the whole structure was occupied and used by Ettore Muti, then the Secretary of the Fascist Party. The white-and-black bichromatic mosaics, still visible in some rooms, were realized in those years.

Currently the towers house the Museum of the Walls, that exhibits, among other things, models of the walls and the gates during different phases of their building.

== See also ==
- Porta Settimiana – Gate of the Aurelian Walls, a landmark of Rome, Italy
- List of ancient monuments in Rome

== Bibliography ==
- Weitzmann, Kurt, ed., Age of spirituality: late antique and early Christian art, third to seventh century, no. 334, 1979, Metropolitan Museum of Art, New York, ISBN 9780870991790; full text available online from The Metropolitan Museum of Art Libraries
- Cozza, Lucos (1990), "Sulla Porta Appia", Journal of Roman Archaeology, 3: 169–171, doi:10.1017/S104775940001093X, S2CID 163133168
- Filippo Coarelli, ”Guida archeologica di Roma”. A.Mondadori Ed., Verona, 1984
- Mauro Quercioli, ”Le mura e le porte di Roma”. Newton Compton Ed., Rome, 1982
- Laura G. Cozzi, ”Le porte i Roma”. F.Spinosi Ed., Rome, 1968

Preceded by Porta San Giovanni	Landmarks of Rome; Porta San Sebastiano	Succeeded by Porta Settimiana
