= San Giovanni in Oleo =

Italian Renaissance church

Coordinates: 41°52′35.8″N 12°30′7.7″E

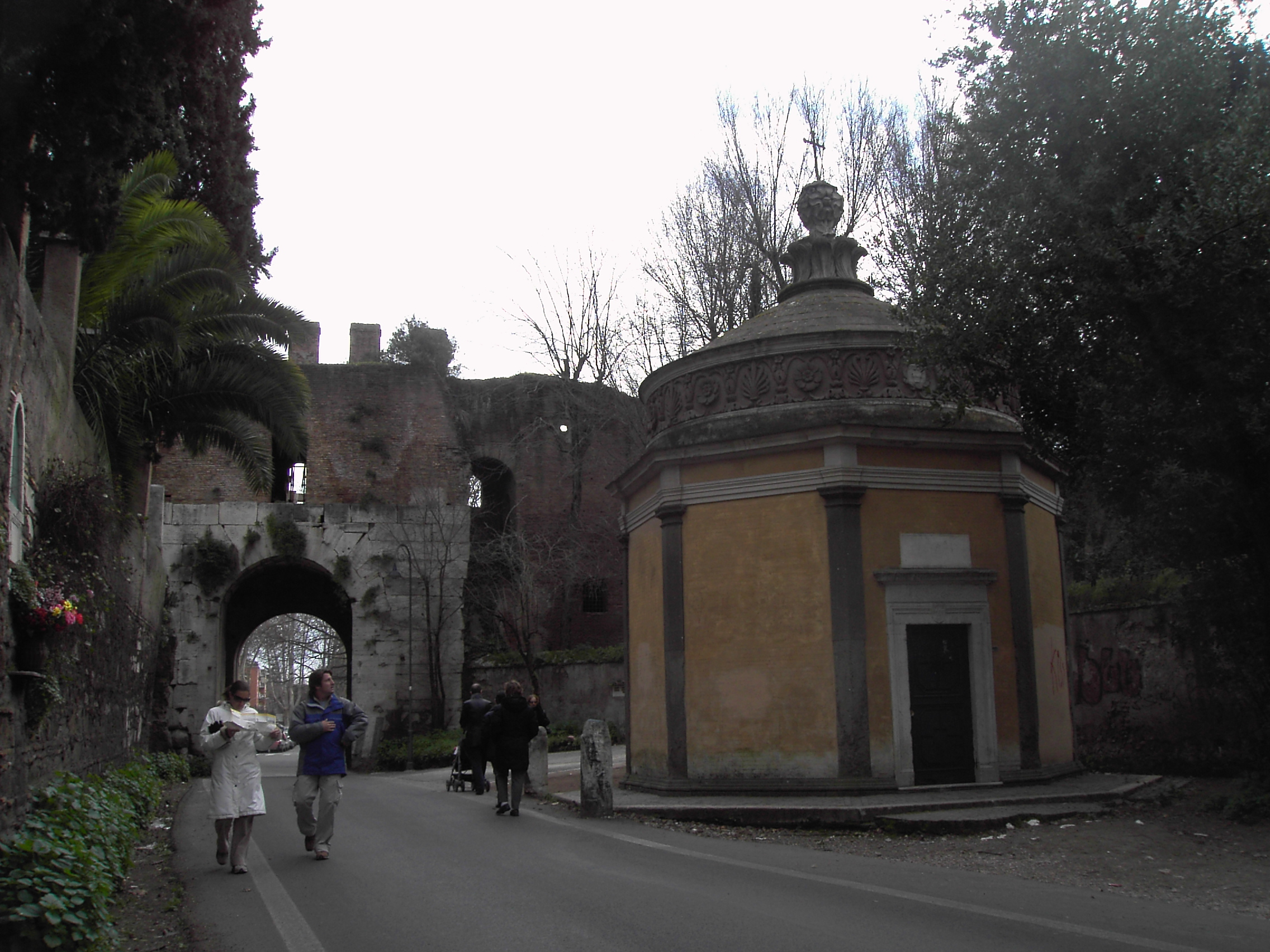
The church of San Giovanni in Oleo, with the Porta Latina in background.

San Giovanni in Oleo is a chapel adjacent to the church of San Giovanni a Porta Latina in Rome. It commemorates the place where, according to legend, in 92 AD, at the hands of the emperor Domitian, the apostle John was immersed in a vat of boiling oil from which he emerged unharmed. Tradition relates that, having failed to execute the apostle, Domitian exiled him to the island of Patmos where John wrote the biblical Book of Revelation. It is supposed that John later died and was buried in Ephesus where a large basilica was built to house his relics. He is the only one of the Twelve Disciples to have been spared from martyrdom.

Although the current building is not ancient, the small centralized form - customarily employed by the Romans for martyria, mausolea and other memorial purposes - may have been inspired by an earlier structure. Documentary sources seem to indicate that San Giovanni a Porta Latina was in existence by the end of the 5th century.

The present octagonal chapel was built circa 1509. The design was commonly ascribed to the architect Donato Bramante, although it is now thought to have been the work either of Antonio da Sangallo the Younger or Baldassare Peruzzi. In 1658, it was remodeled by Borromini who added the frieze and the elaborate finial (the original of which is now preserved in the portico of the church nearby). On the door is the coat of arms of the French prelate Benoît Adam, with the motto "Au plaisir de Dieu". The frescos depicting Saint John's attempted execution were painted by Lazzaro Baldi in 1716.
