= Porta Aurelia-Sancti Petri =

Gate of the Aurelian walls in Rome

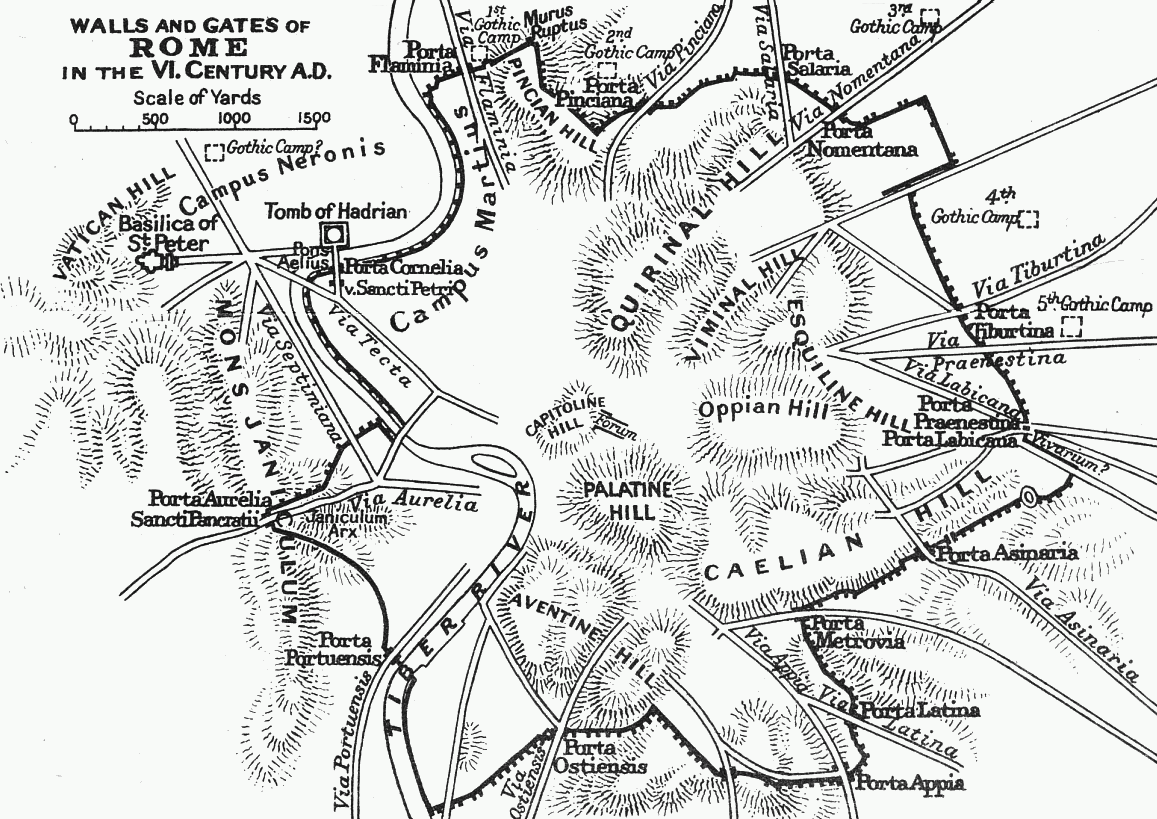
- Walls of Rome in the 6th century

- Location within Rome
- Interactive map of Porta Aurelia-Sancti Petri
- 41°54′03.6″N 12°28′0.7″E
- Location: Rome

The Porta Aurelia-Sancti Petri was one of the gates of the Aurelian Walls in Rome (Italy). It was originally called the Porta Cornelia.

The Porta Cornelia was immediately west of the bridgehead of the Pons Aelius, the current Ponte Sant'Angelo. This is where the Via Cornelia began, from which the gate took its name. In the first centuries AD this was not an important road, but that changed with the rise of Christianity. Constantine the Great had Old St. Peter's Basilica built in the 4th century, over the Roman and Christian necropolis on Via Cornelia. Between 270 and 280 the great Aurelian Walls were built around Rome. The Vatican Hill was only sparsely populated and remained outside the wall. The Basilica and this northern entrance to Rome, however, had to be able to be defended, and between 401 and 403 the Emperor Honorius had the Mausoleum of Hadrian converted into the Castel Sant'Angelo. The Porta Cornelia was built into the defensive walls of the Castle and gave access to the Vatican from the city. The gate was demolished after the Middle Ages. It is no longer known what exactly it looked like.

The gate was also known as Porta Aurelia Sancti-Petri because the important Via Aurelia could also be reached by this gate and Via Cornelia. However, there was already a Porta Aurelia on the Janiculum (today's Porta San Pancrazio) and the addition of Sancti Petri ("at St. Peter's") is therefore intended to distinguish between the two gates.
