= Aurelian Walls =

3rd-century fortifications of Rome

Coordinates: 41°52′24″N 12°29′56″E

- Part of Rome
- Italy
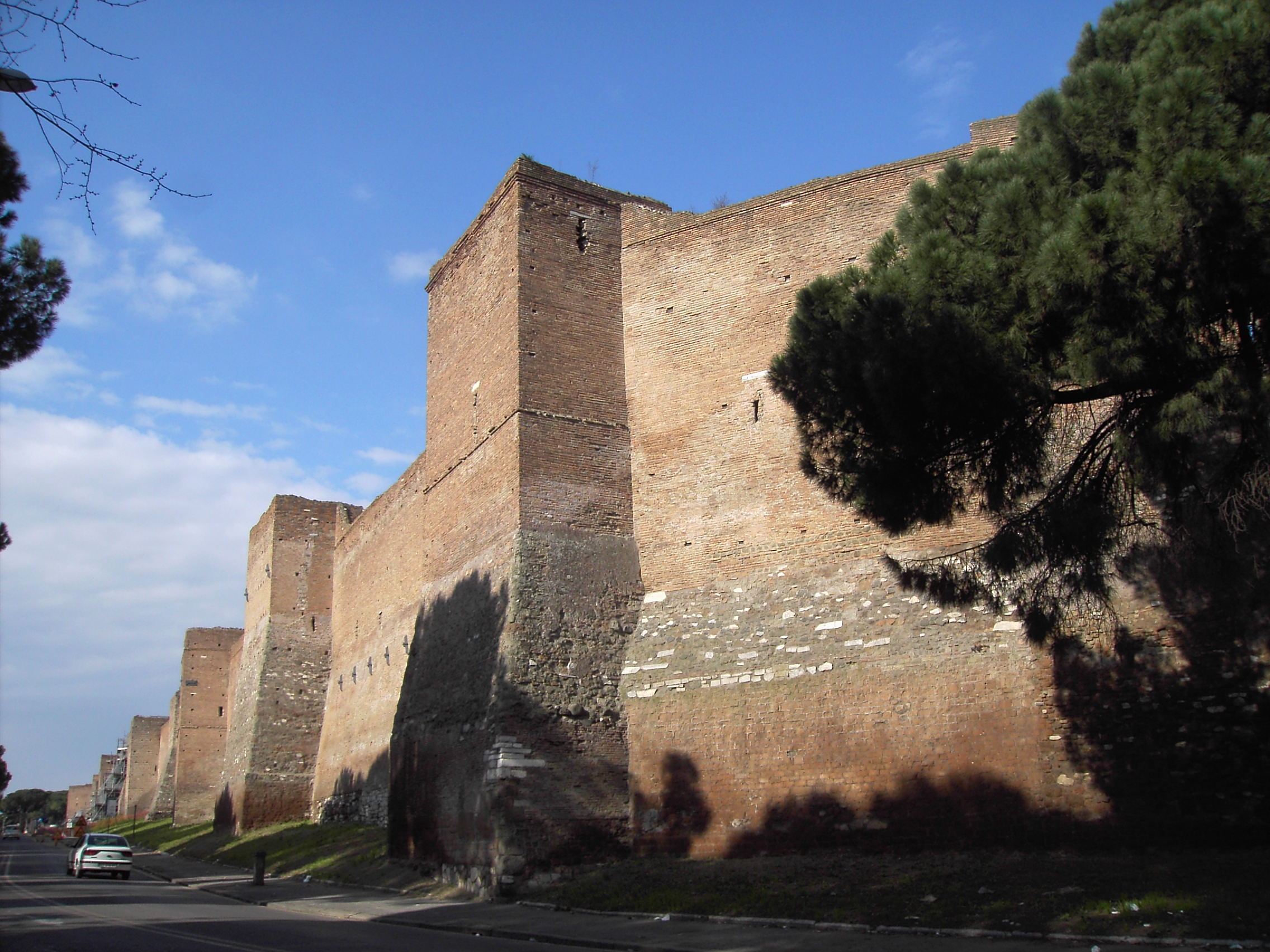
- A section of Aurelian Wall between the Porta Ardeatina and Porta San Sebastiano

- Map of ancient Rome with the Aurelian Walls (red line) and its gates highlighted. The 4th-century BC Servian Walls (blue line) are also shown. Highlands and the seven hills of Rome are shown in beige, with names; lowlands are in white.

Site information
- Type: Defensive wall
- Owner: Italian Government
- Open to the public: Open to public
- Condition: Remaining sections: Either semi-ruinous or partly restored

Location
- Location within Rome
- Height: Up to 10 metres (33 ft)

Site history
- Built: AD 271–275
- Built by: Roman citizens
- Materials: Concrete; Brick; Mortar
- Demolished: Some parts in the Medieval Period
- Events: Sack of Rome (410); Sack of Rome (455); Capture of Rome

Garrison information
- Garrison: Praetorian Guard
- Occupants: Romans

The Aurelian Walls (Italian: Mura aureliane) are a line of city walls built between AD 271 and AD 275 in Rome, Italy, during the reign of the Roman Emperor Aurelian. They superseded the earlier Servian Wall built during the 4th century BC.

The walls enclosed all the seven hills of Rome plus the Campus Martius and, on the right bank of the Tiber, the Trastevere district. The river banks within the city limits appear to have been left unfortified, although they were fortified along the Campus Martius. The size of the entire enclosed area is 1,400 hectares (3,500 acres). The wall cut through populated areas: in reality the city at the time embraced 2,400 hectares (5,900 acres). Pliny the Elder in the first century AD suggested that the densely populated areas, extrema tectorum ("the limits of the roofed areas") extended 2.8 kilometres (1.7 mi) from the Golden Milestone in the Forum (Natural History 3.67).

== Construction ==
The full circuit ran for 19 km (12 mi) surrounding an area of 13.7 km^{2} (5.3 sq mi). The walls were constructed in brick-faced concrete, 3.5 m (11 ft) thick and 8 m (26 ft) high, with a square tower every 100 Roman feet (29.6 m (97 ft)).

In the 4th century, remodelling doubled the height of the walls to 16 m (52 ft). By 500 AD, the circuit possessed 383 towers, 7,020 crenellations, 18 main gates, 5 postern gates, 116 latrines, and 2,066 large external windows.

== History ==
By the third century AD, the boundaries of Rome had grown far beyond the area enclosed by the old Servian Wall, built during the Republican period in the late 4th century BC. Rome had remained unfortified during the subsequent centuries of expansion and consolidation due to lack of hostile threats against the city. The citizens of Rome took great pride in knowing that Rome required no fortifications because of the stability brought by the Pax Romana and the protection of the Roman army. However, the need for updated defences became acute during the crisis of the Third Century, when various tribes moved through the Germanic frontier and the Roman army struggled to stop them. In 270, groups of Juthungi and Vandals invaded northern Italy, inflicting a severe defeat on the Romans at Placentia (modern Piacenza) before eventually being driven back. Further trouble broke out in Rome itself in the summer of 271, when the mint workers rose in rebellion. Several thousand people died in the fierce fighting that resulted.

Aurelian's construction of the walls as an emergency measure was a reaction to the invasion of 270; the historian Aurelius Victor states explicitly that the project aimed to alleviate the city's vulnerability. It may also have been intended to send a political signal as a statement that Aurelian trusted that the people of Rome would remain loyal, as well as serving as a public declaration of the emperor's firm hold on power. The construction of the walls was by far the largest building project that had taken place in Rome for many decades, and their construction was a concrete statement of the continued strength of Rome. The construction project was unusually left to the citizens themselves to complete as Aurelian could not afford to spare a single legionary for the project. The root of this unorthodox practice was the imminent threat of the foreign tribes coupled with the wavering strength of the military as a whole due to being subject to years of bloody civil war, famine and the Plague of Cyprian.

The walls were built in the short time of only five years, though Aurelian himself died before the completion of the project. Progress was accelerated, and money saved, by incorporating existing buildings into the structure. These included the Amphitheatrum Castrense, the Castra Praetoria, the Pyramid of Cestius, and even a section of the Aqua Claudia aqueduct near the Porta Maggiore. As much as a sixth of the walls is estimated to have been composed of pre-existing structures. An area behind the walls was cleared and sentry passages were built to enable it to be reinforced quickly in an emergency.

The actual effectiveness of the wall is disputable, given the relatively small size of the city's garrison. The entire combined strength of the Praetorian Guard, cohortes urbanae, and vigiles of Rome was only about 25,000 men – far too few to defend the circuit adequately. However, the military intention of the wall was not to withstand prolonged siege warfare; it was not common for the invading armies to besiege cities, as they were insufficiently equipped and provisioned for such a task. Instead, they carried out hit-and-run raids against ill-defended targets. The wall was a deterrent against such tactics.

Parts of the wall were doubled in height by Maxentius in the period 306–312 AD, who also improved the watch-towers. In 401, under Honorius, the walls and the gates were improved. At this time, the Tomb of Hadrian across the Tiber was incorporated as a fortress in the city defenses.

== Later use ==
The Aurelian Walls halted the Arab raid against Rome in 846 and limited the raiders' pillaging, sacking, and plundering of historic treasures to sites outside the walls, notably the basilicas of Old St Peter's and St Paul's-Outside-the-Walls. This vulnerability prompted the construction of the Leonine walls from 848 to 852 to encircle Vatican Hill.

The Aurelian Walls continued as a significant military defense for the city of Rome until 20 September 1870, when the Bersaglieri of the Kingdom of Italy breached the wall near the Porta Pia and captured Rome. The walls also defined the boundary of the city of Rome up until the 19th century, with the built-up area being confined within the walled area. Today, the walls define "central Rome" for the purposes of taxi fare calculation. Trips between Rome's major airports and points within the walls are charged at a predetermined rate.

The Aurelian Walls remain remarkably well-preserved today, largely the result of their constant use as Rome's primary fortification until the 19th century. The Museo delle Mura near the Porta San Sebastiano offers information on the walls' construction and how the defenses operated. The best-preserved sections of the walls are found from the Muro Torto (Villa Borghese) to Corso d'Italia to Castro Pretorio; from Porta San Giovanni to Porta Ardeatina; from Porta Ostiense to the Tiber; and around Porta San Pancrazio.

== Gates ==
List of gates (porte), from the northernmost and clockwise:

- Porta del Popolo (Porta Flaminia) – here begins via Flaminia
- Porta Pinciana
- Porta Salaria – here begins via Salaria
- Porta Pia – here begins the new via Nomentana
- Porta Nomentana – here began the old via Nomentana
- Porta Praetoriana – old entrance to Castra Praetoria, the camp of the Praetorian Guard
- Porta Tiburtina – here begins via Tiburtina
- Porta Maggiore (Porta Praenestina) – here three aqueducts meet, and via Praenestina begins
- Porta San Giovanni – near Basilica di San Giovanni in Laterano
- Porta Asinaria – here begins the old via Tuscolana
- Porta Metronia
- Porta Latina – here begins via Latina
- Porta San Sebastiano (Porta Appia) – here begins the Appian Way
- Porta Ardeatina
- Porta San Paolo (Porta Ostiense) – next to the Pyramid of Cestius, leading to Basilica di San Paolo fuori le Mura, here via Ostiense begins

Gates in Trastevere (from the southernmost and clockwise):

- Porta Portuensis
- Porta Aurelia/San Pancrazio
- Porta Settimiana
- Porta Aurelia-Sancti Petri (also known as Porta Cornelia)

== Gallery ==
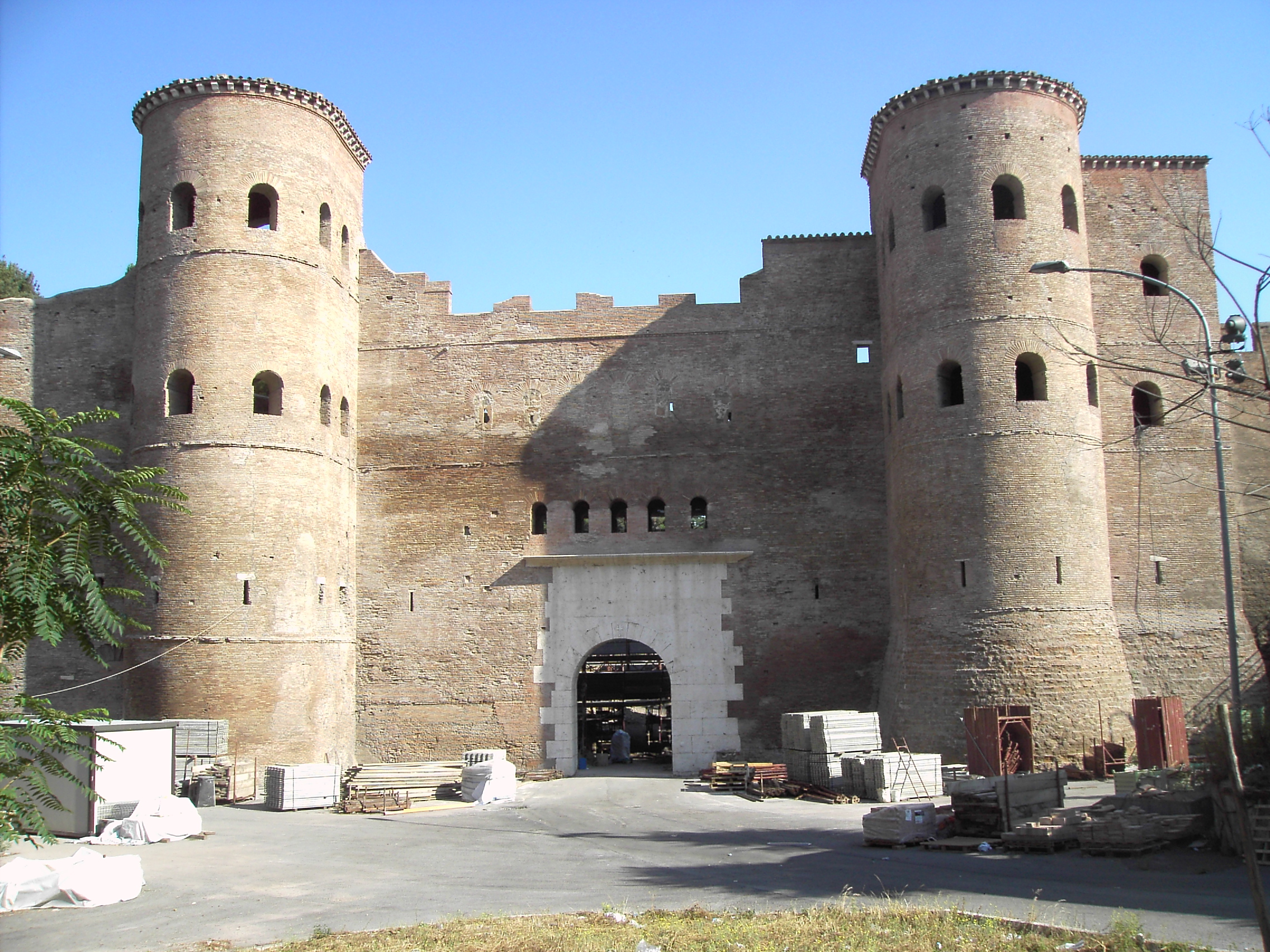
Porta Asinaria.

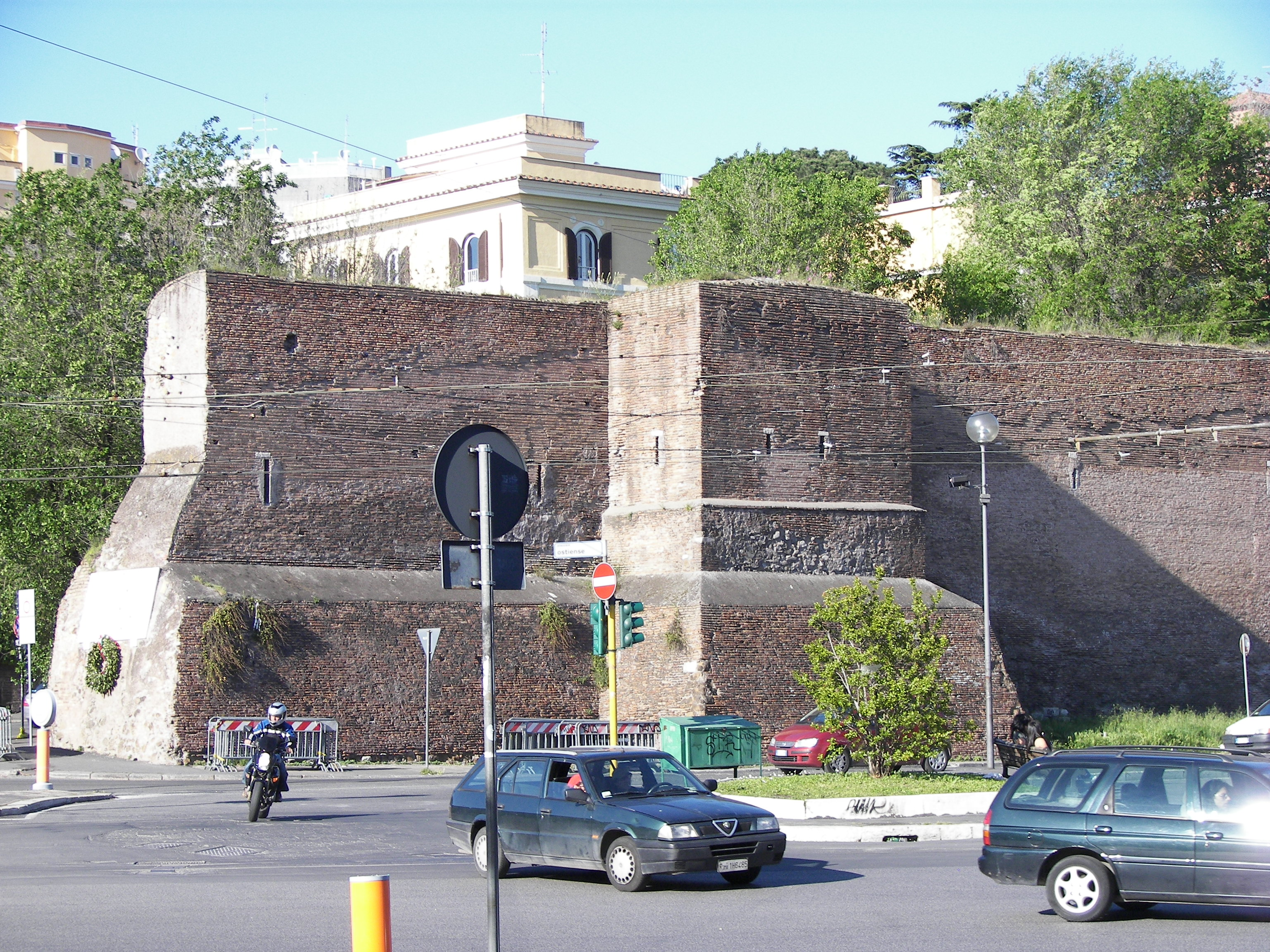
A section of wall near the Pyramid of Cestius.

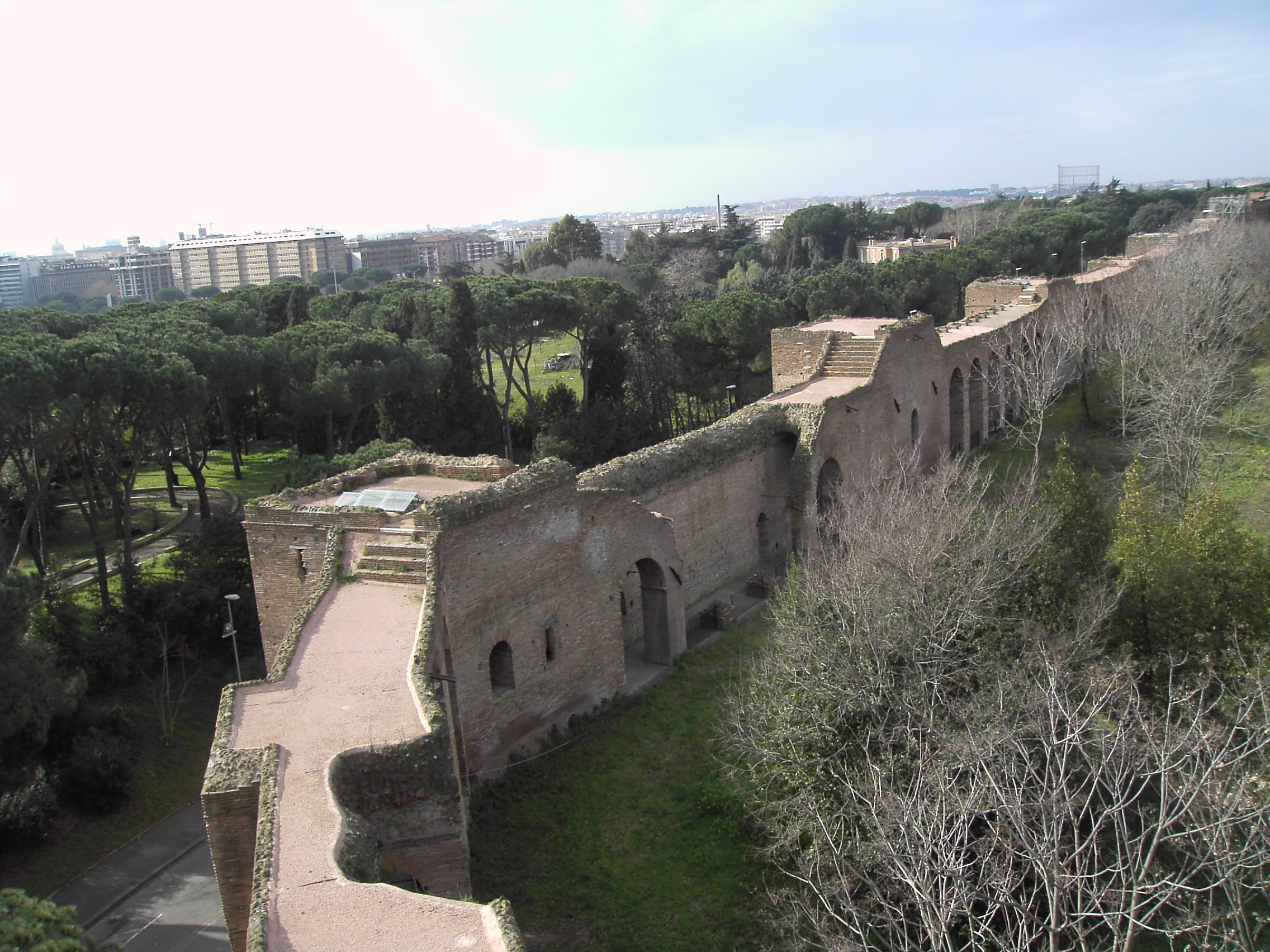
An interior view of the Aurelian Walls near Porta San Sebastiano.

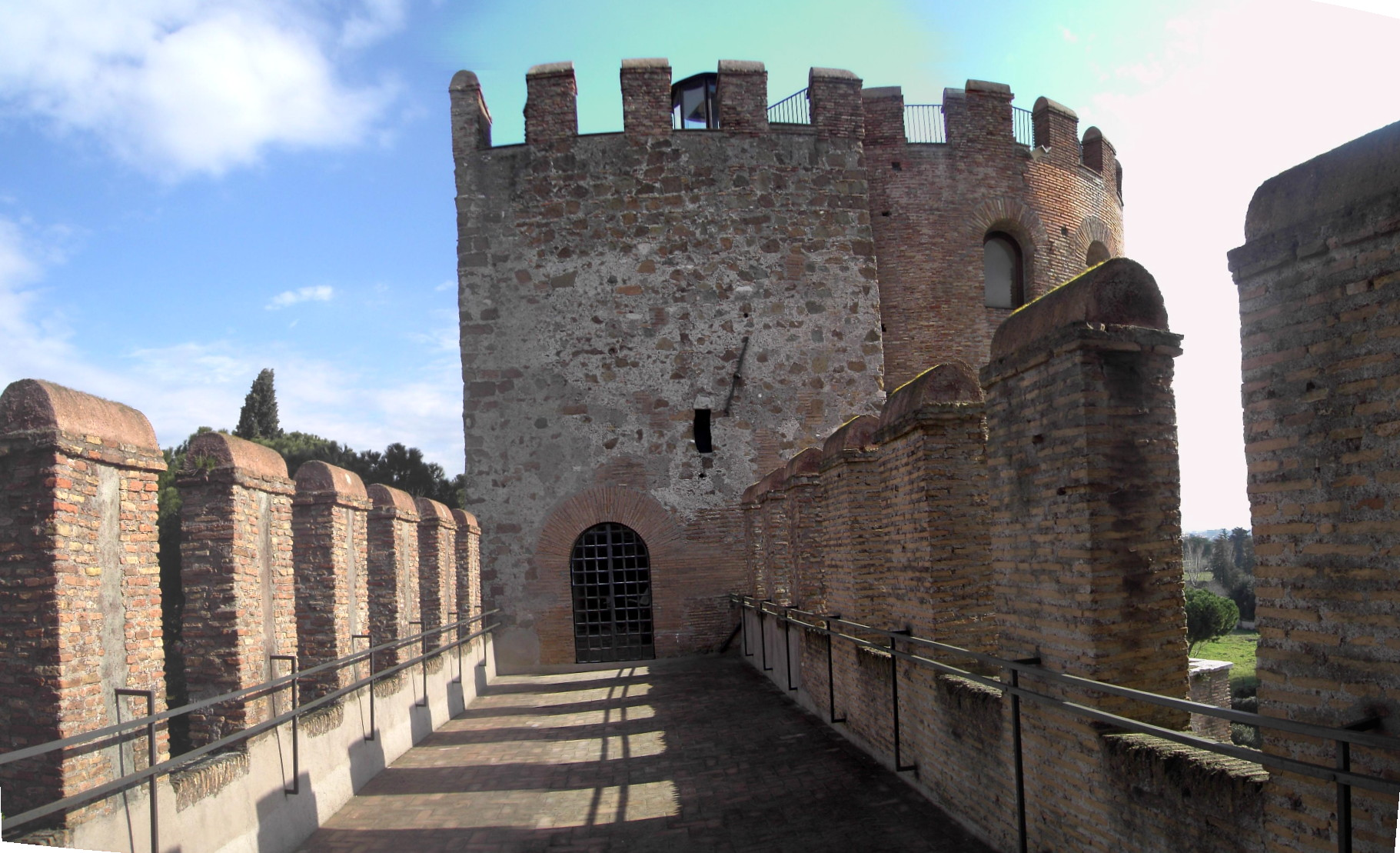
A restored section between towers on the wall.

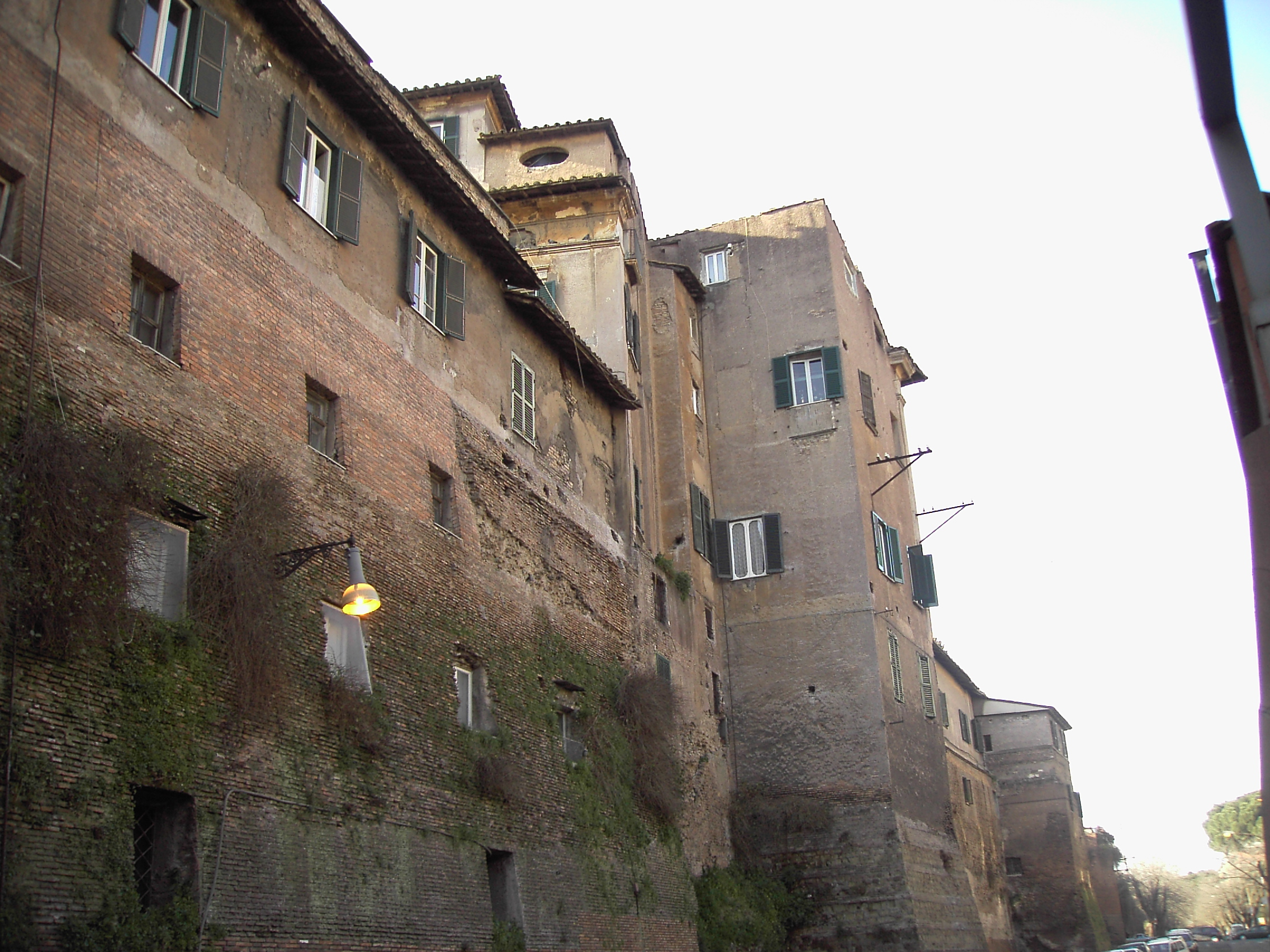
Parts of the Roman wall and its towers have become domestic properties in Rome.

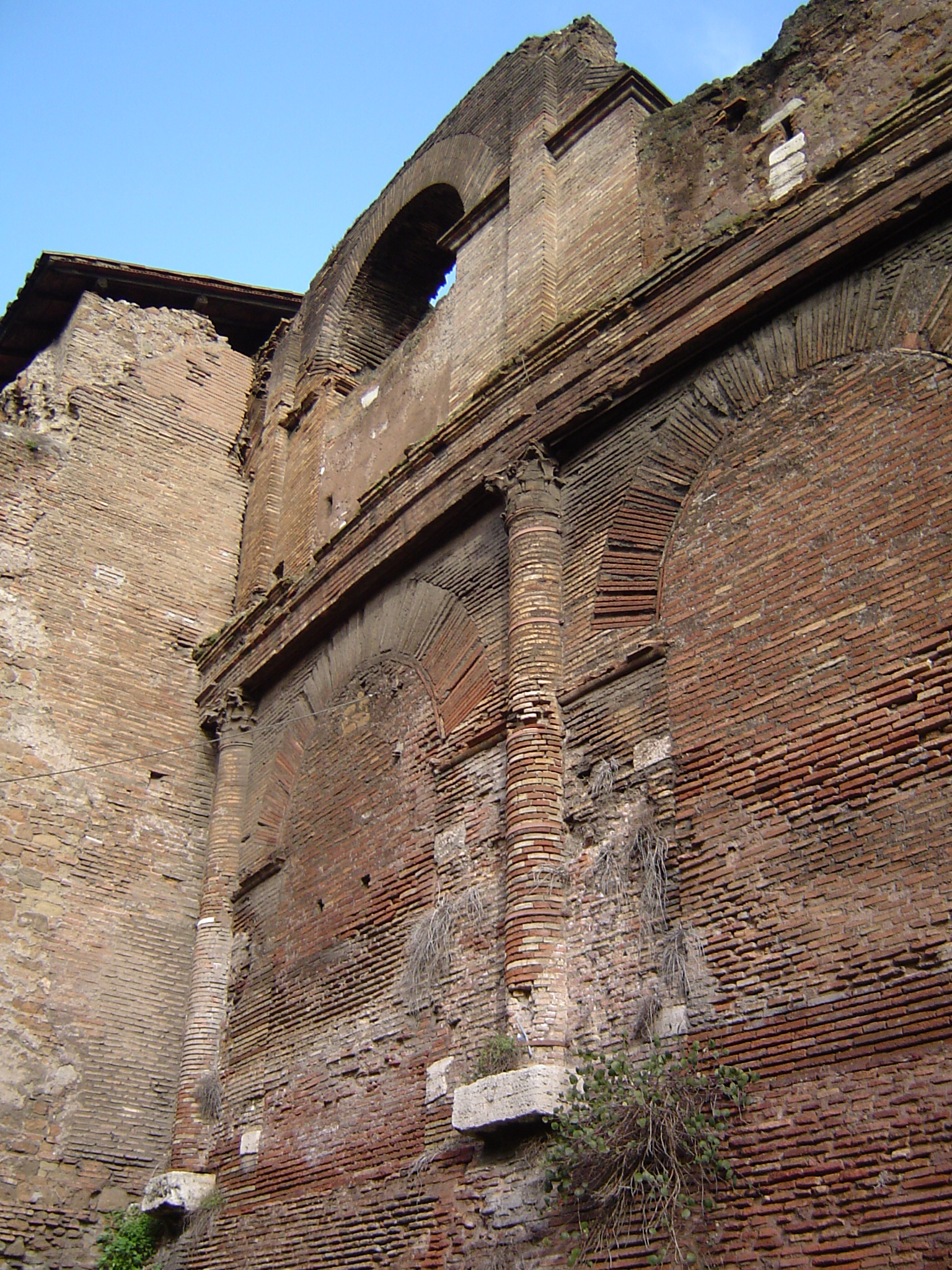
The 1700-year-old walls were constructed from tiled brick and concrete.

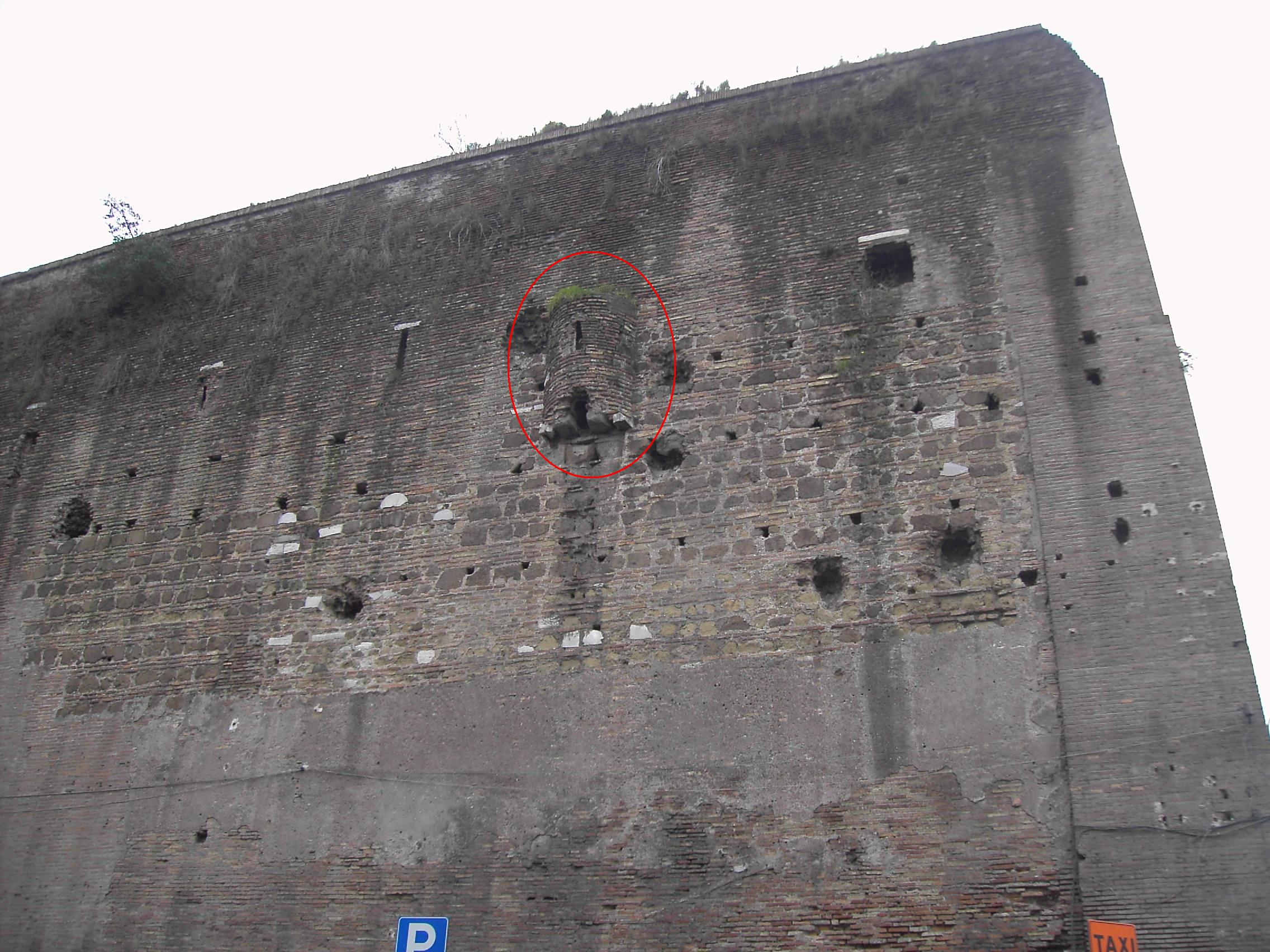
A latrine (circled in red) built into the wall near the Porta Salaria.

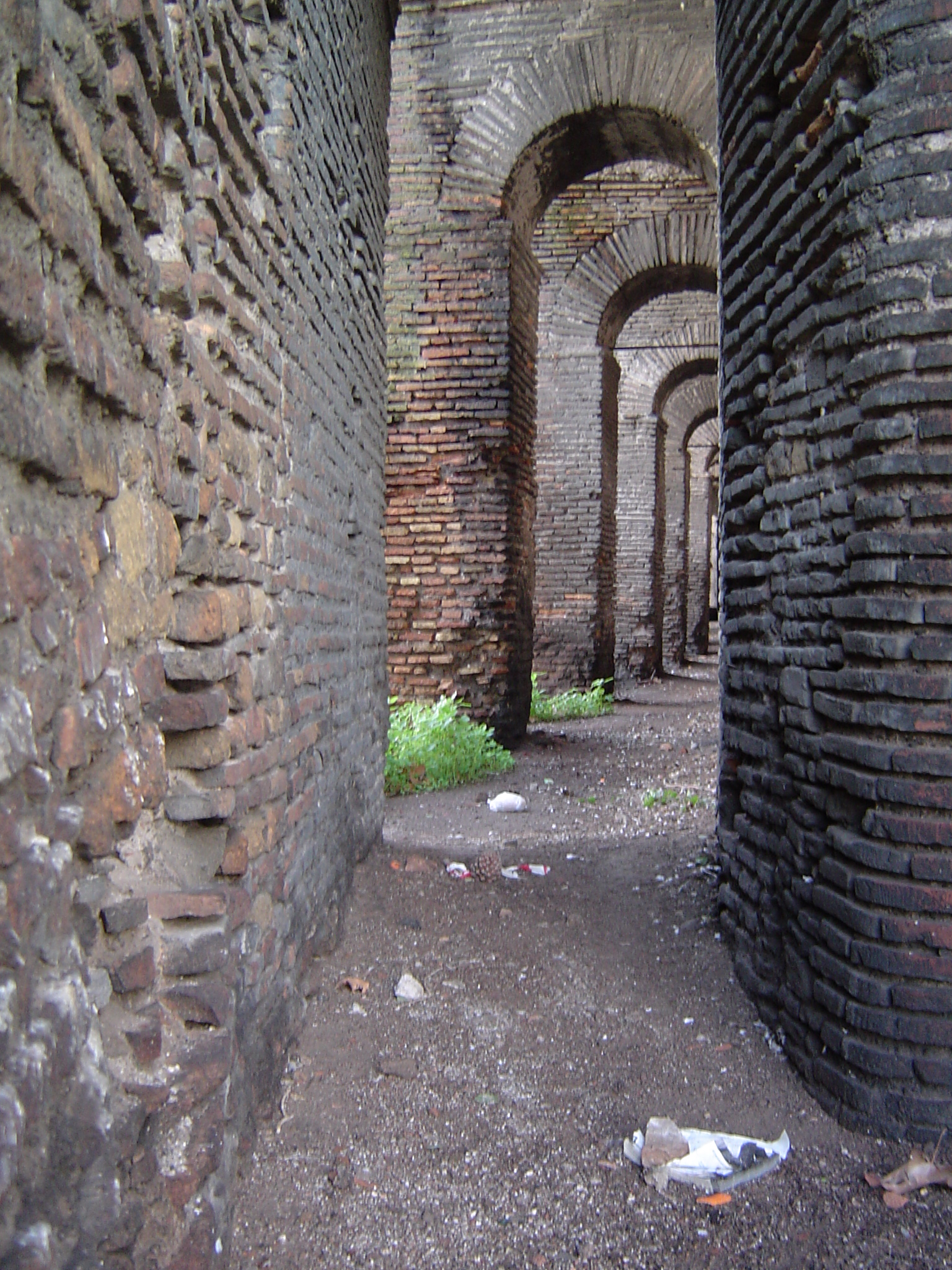
Sentry passage near Porta Metronia.

== See also ==
- Leonine Wall, the first wall around Vatican City
- Museum of the Walls, Rome
- Sack of Rome
- Walls of Constantinople

== Sources ==
- Mancini, Rossana (2001). Le mura Aureliane di Roma. Atlante di un palinsesto murario, Quasar, Roma ISBN 88-7140-199-9

Preceded by Rome	Landmarks of Rome; Aurelian Walls	Succeeded by Porta Ardeatina
