= Porta Latina =

Gate of the Aurelian walls, a landmark of Rome, Italy

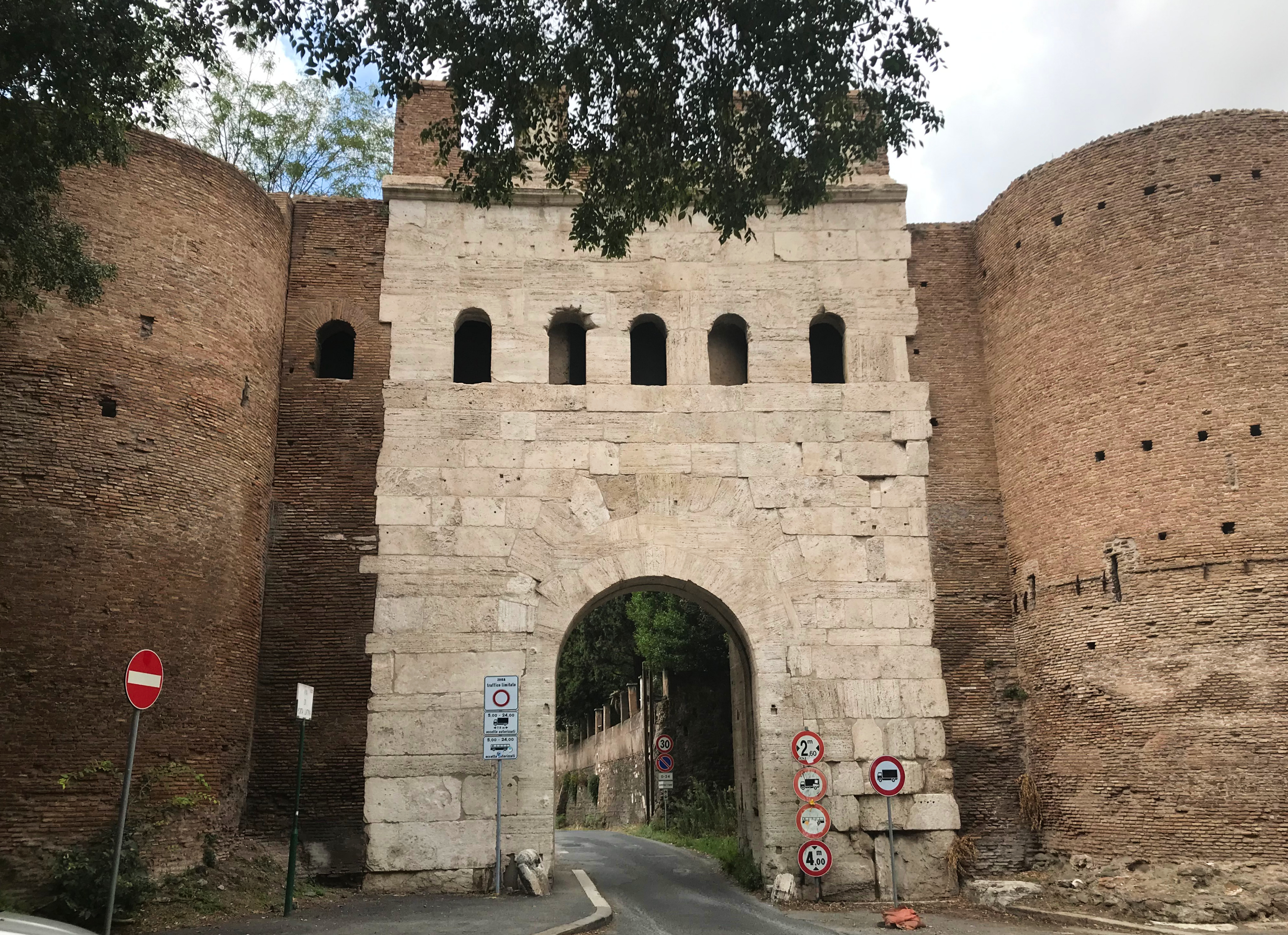
- Porta Latina today

- Location within Rome
- Interactive map of Porta Latina
- 41°52′35.0394″N 12°30′8.4564″E
- Type: City gate
- Location: Regio XII Piscina Publica

History
- Built: 5th century A.D.
- Built by: Honorius

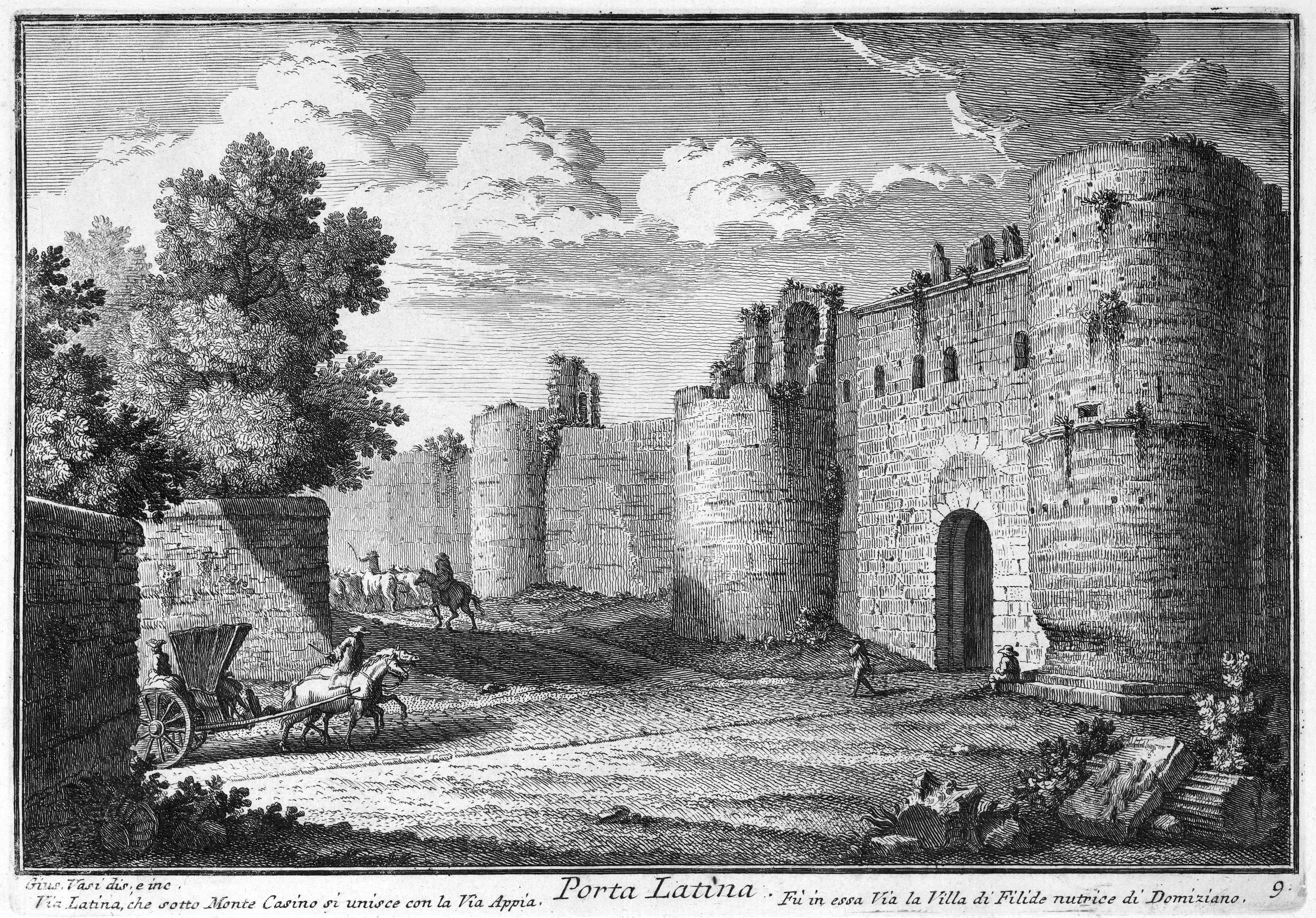
The Porta Latina in an 18th-century etching by Giuseppe Vasi.

The Porta Latina (Latin - Latin Gate) is a single-arched gate in the Aurelian Walls of ancient Rome.

== History ==
It marked the Rome end of the Via Latina and gives its name to the church of San Giovanni a Porta Latina. Most of the present structure dates to Honorius, including the arch's voussoirs (though they are often wrongly attributed to a 6th-century restoration by Belisarius, due to a cross and circle sculpted on the inner keystone, and the Chi Rho between Α and Ω sculpted on the outer keystone). The gate retained its name throughout the Middle Ages. Also nearby are the oratory of San Giovanni in Oleo and the pagan Columbarium of Pomponius Hylas.

The gate's single arch is built of irregular blocks of travertine, with a row of five windows above on the outside, and a sixth in brick, at the south end, surmounted by stone battlements. The arch is flanked by two semi-circular towers of brick-faced concrete (almost entirely rebuilt, probably in the 6th century), which do not rise above the top of the central section. The north tower rests on masonry foundations that may have belonged to a tomb.

== See also ==
- Porta Maggiore – Gate of the Aurelian walls, a landmark of Rome, Italy
- List of ancient monuments in Rome

== Notes ==
Preceded by Porta Asinaria	Landmarks of Rome; Porta Latina	Succeeded by Porta Maggiore
