= Porta San Giovanni (Rome) =

Gate of the Aurelian walls, a landmark of Rome, Italy

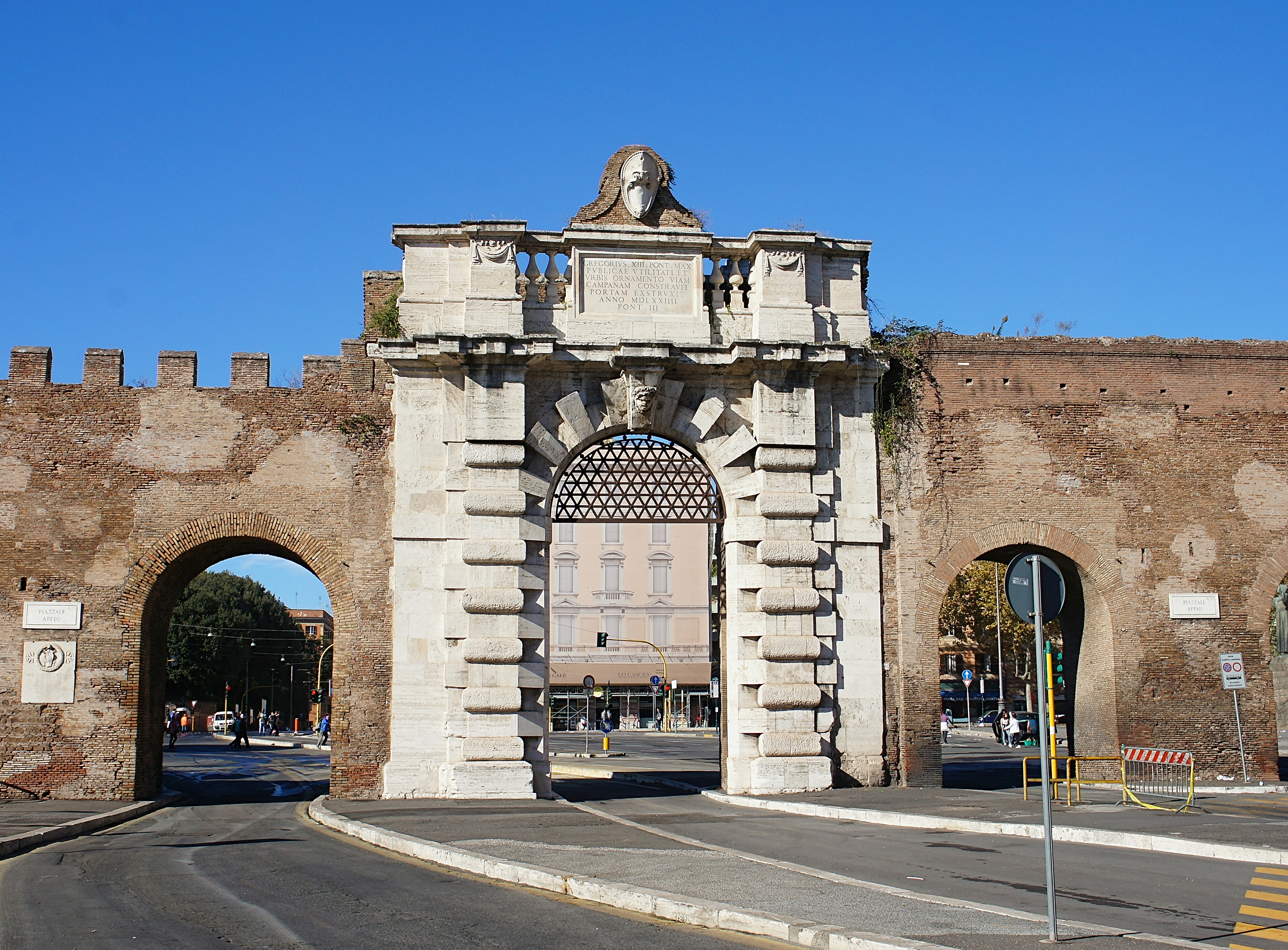
- External façade of the Porta San Giovanni.
- Click on the map for a fullscreen view
- Coordinates: 41°53′9″N 12°30′33″E

Porta San Giovanni is a gate in the Aurelian Wall of Rome, Italy, named after the nearby Archbasilica of Saint John Lateran.

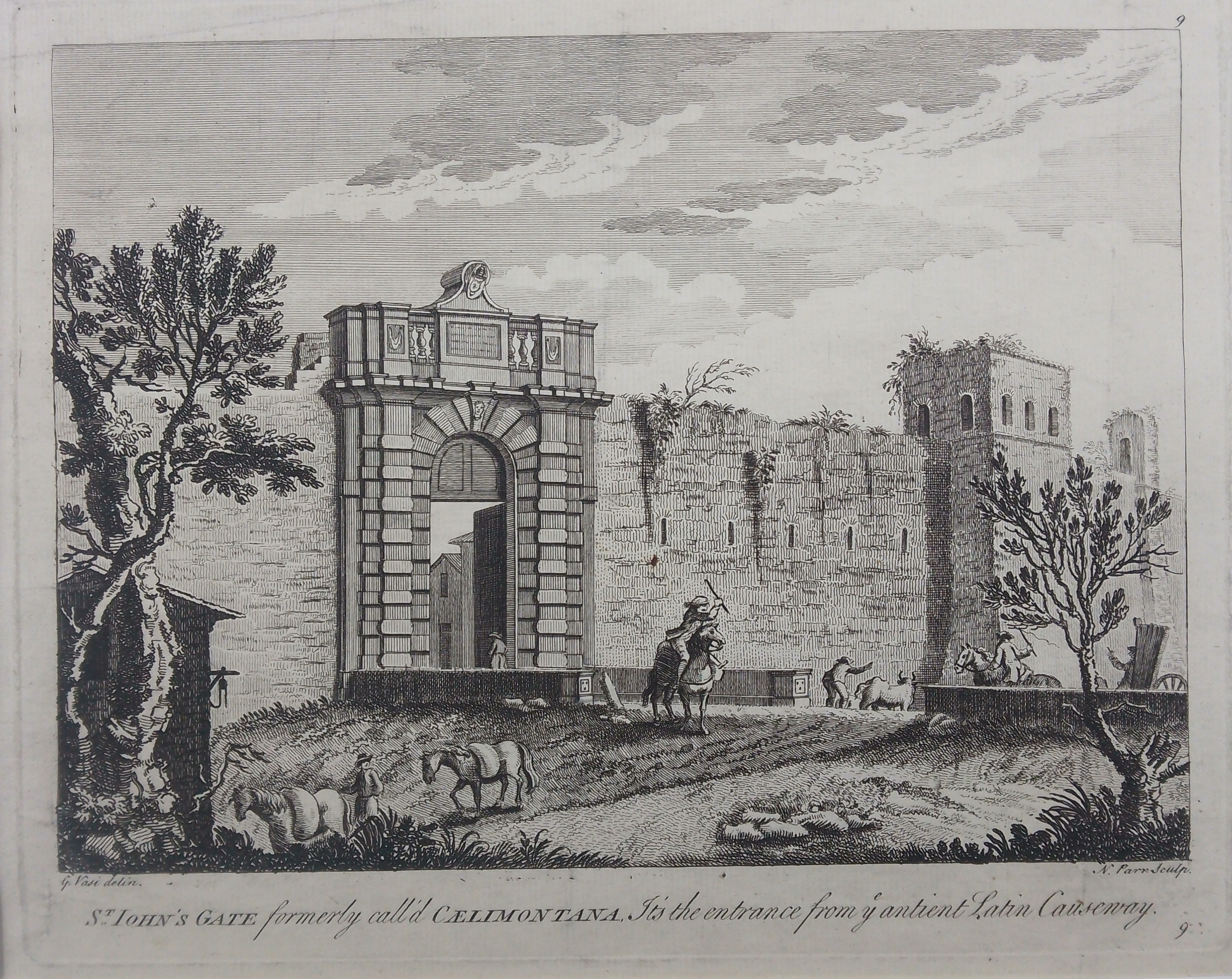
Porta San Giovanni (Rome)

== History ==
It consists of a single grand arch built for Pope Gregory XIII in opera forse by Giacomo della Porta or, it is argued, Giacomo del Duca, who had collaborated with Michelangelo on the Porta Pia. The confusion is because the chronology of the era merely speaks of a famous architect called Giacomo. Popular tradition insists the architect was Della Porta, for he died in crowds at the gate, "which he had built" of violent indigestion brought on by melons and watermelons, returning from a trip to the Castelli Romani.

Inaugurated in 1574, it had been necessitated by the reorganization of the whole Lateran area to facilitate traffic to and from southern Italy. Its opening led to the definitive closure of the neighboring and more imposing Porta Asinaria, of Aurelian date, which was by the 1570s proving unable to sustain such a high level of traffic and almost unusable due to the progressive raising of the road level neighboring.

The commemorative inscription above the arch reads:

GREGORIVS XIII PONT. MAX
PVBLICAE VTILITATI ET VRBIS ORNAMENTO
VIAM CAMPANAM CONSTRAVIT
PORTAM EXSTRVXIT
ANNO MDLXXIIII PONT. III

Its design is conceived as more like the entrance to a villa than as a defensive work, lacking side towers, ramparts, and battlements, and marked instead by pronounced rustication work and by a simple decorative scheme composed of a large bearded head atop the arch on the external side.

The road in fact gives access to the via Campana (now the Via Appia Nuova), which for its first 3 miles follows the route of the ancient Via Asinaria, then that of the Via Labicana. The name via Campana, it is presumed, derives both from the road's ultimate destination of Campania and from the Roman Campagna through which it runs.

Besides the historical and military events on its reliefs, the Porta San Giovanni is linked to popular Roman traditions, now almost entirely disappeared, especially that relating to the Notte di San Giovanni, on 23 June, the notte delle streghe, with a major festival. According to legend, on that night the ghost of Herodias, who had convinced her husband Herod Antipas to decapitate John the Baptist, organizes a Witches' Sabbath on the Lateran meadows – to chase them away, the Romans organised a big party with rattles and fireworks. The notti di S. Giovanni was always characterised by the custom of eating slugs, whose horns symbolised discord (the meaning of the tradition is much more recent) – the eaten slugs, thus, buried in the stomach all arguments and resentments that had accumulated over the previous year, giving the custom the meaning of reconciliation.

The modern Appio-Latino quarter, now outside the gate, was set up in 1926 by demolishing and building over houses, cottages, vineyards, inns, and meadows. To keep the gate viable, also in 1926 fornici were opened at its sides, which can still be seen today.

== See also ==
- Porta San Sebastiano – Gate of the Aurelian walls, a landmark of Rome, Italy

== Sources ==
- Quercioli, Mauro (1982). Le mura e le porte di Roma. Rome: Newton & Compton.
- Cozzi, Laura G. (1968). Le porte di Roma. Rome: F. Spinosi.

| Preceded by Porta San Paolo | Landmarks of Rome; Porta San Giovanni | Succeeded by Porta San Sebastiano |
