= Porta Asinaria =

Gate of the Aurelian walls, a landmark of Rome, Italy

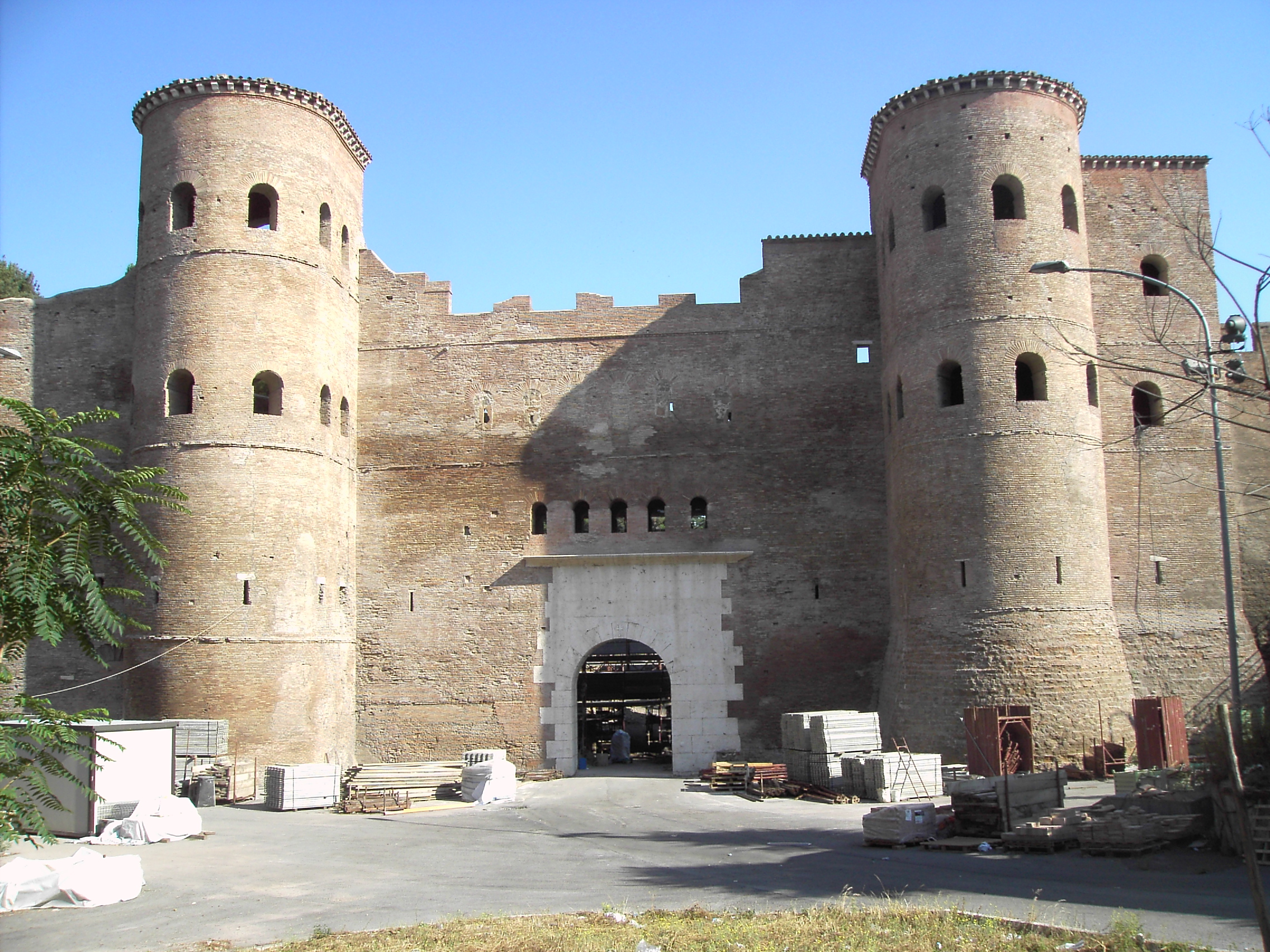
- External façade of the Porta Asinaria.

- Location within Rome
- Interactive map of Porta Asinaria
- 41°53′8″N 12°30′31″E
- Location: Rome

History
- Built: 271–275 AD

The Porta Asinaria is a gate in the Aurelian Walls of Rome. Dominated by two protruding tower blocks and associated guard rooms, it was built between 271 and 275 AD, at the same time as the Wall itself. Unlike most of the other gates, it was not rebuilt or fortified by Honorius or restored by Theodoric.

It is through this gate that East Roman troops under General Belisarius entered the city in 536, reclaiming the city for the Byzantine Empire from the Ostrogoths.

By the 16th century it had become overwhelmed by traffic. A new breach in the walls was made nearby to create the Porta San Giovanni. At this point, the Porta Asinaria was closed to traffic.

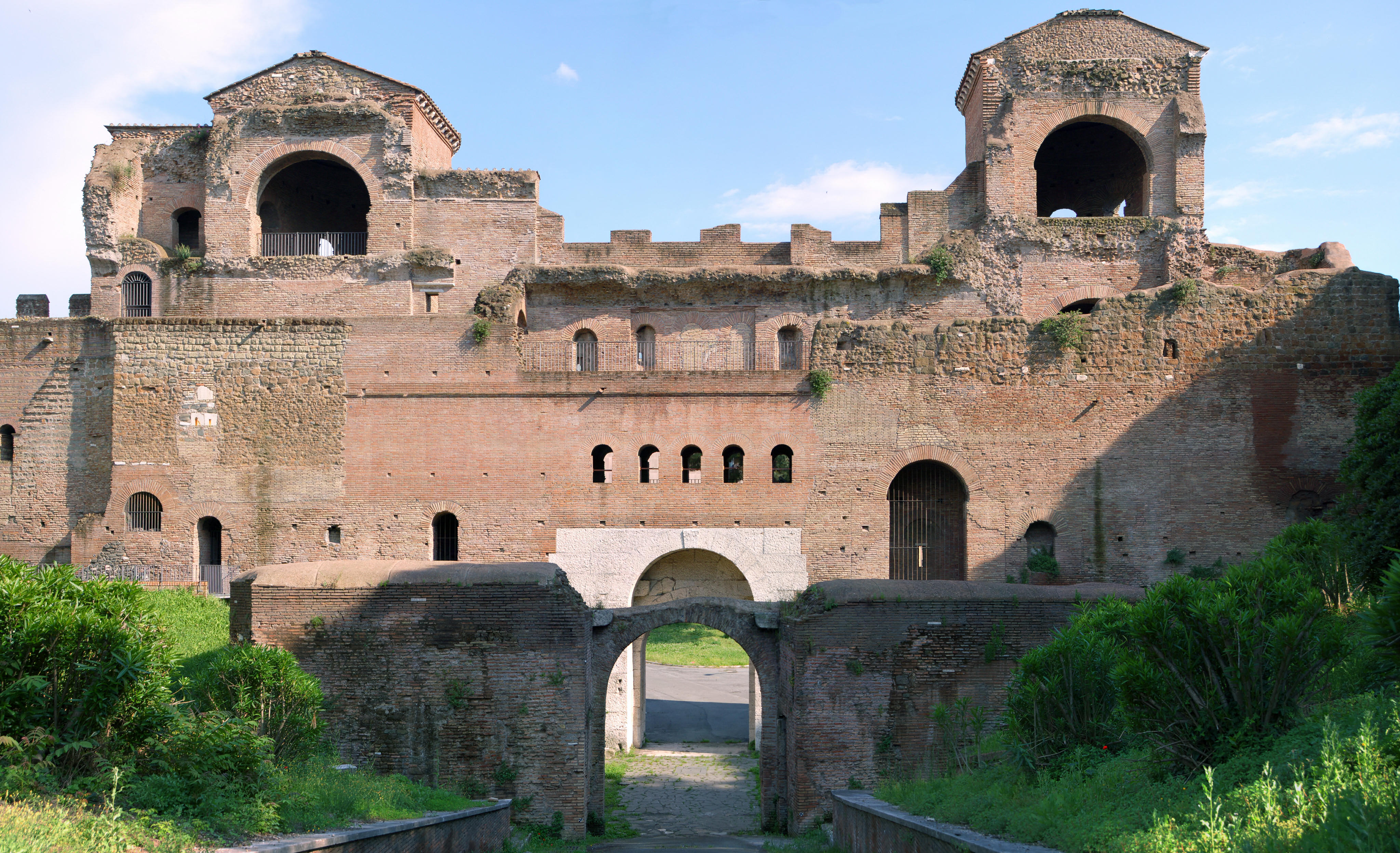
Façade from within the city walls

== See also ==
- Porta Latina – Gate of the Aurelian walls, a landmark of Rome, Italy
- List of ancient monuments in Rome

== Notes ==
Preceded by Porta Ardeatina	Landmarks of Rome; Porta Asinaria	Succeeded by Porta Latina
