= Ruffman =

Surname

Ruffman is a surname. Notable people with the surname include:

- Ruff Ruffman of FETCH! with Ruff Ruffman
- Mag Ruffman (born 1957), Canadian comedian, actress and television host

== See also ==
- Raffman
- Ruffian (disambiguation)
- Ruffin (disambiguation)
