= Trinity Church, Munich =

Coordinates: 48°08′27″N 11°34′15″E

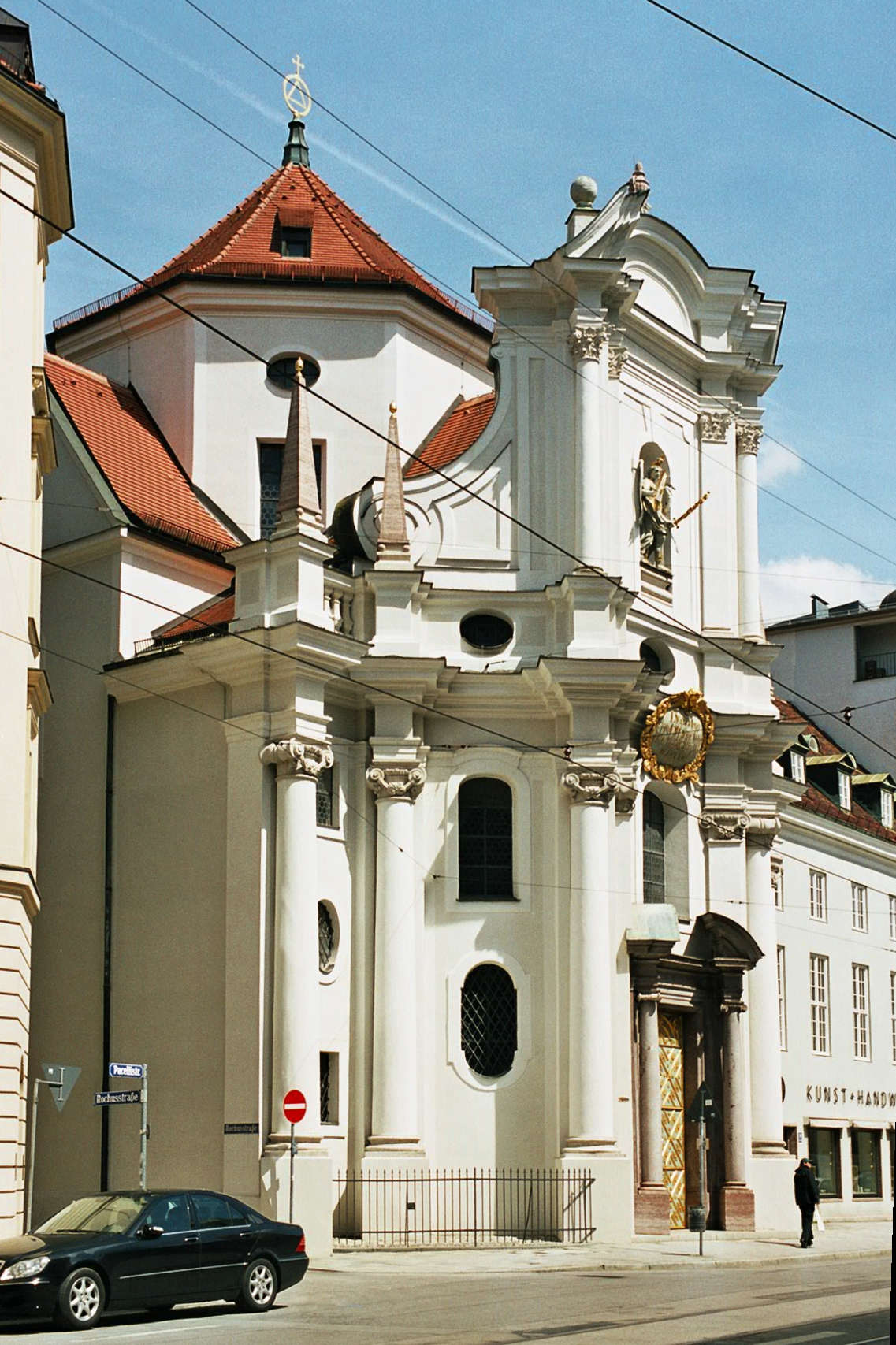
Trinity Church

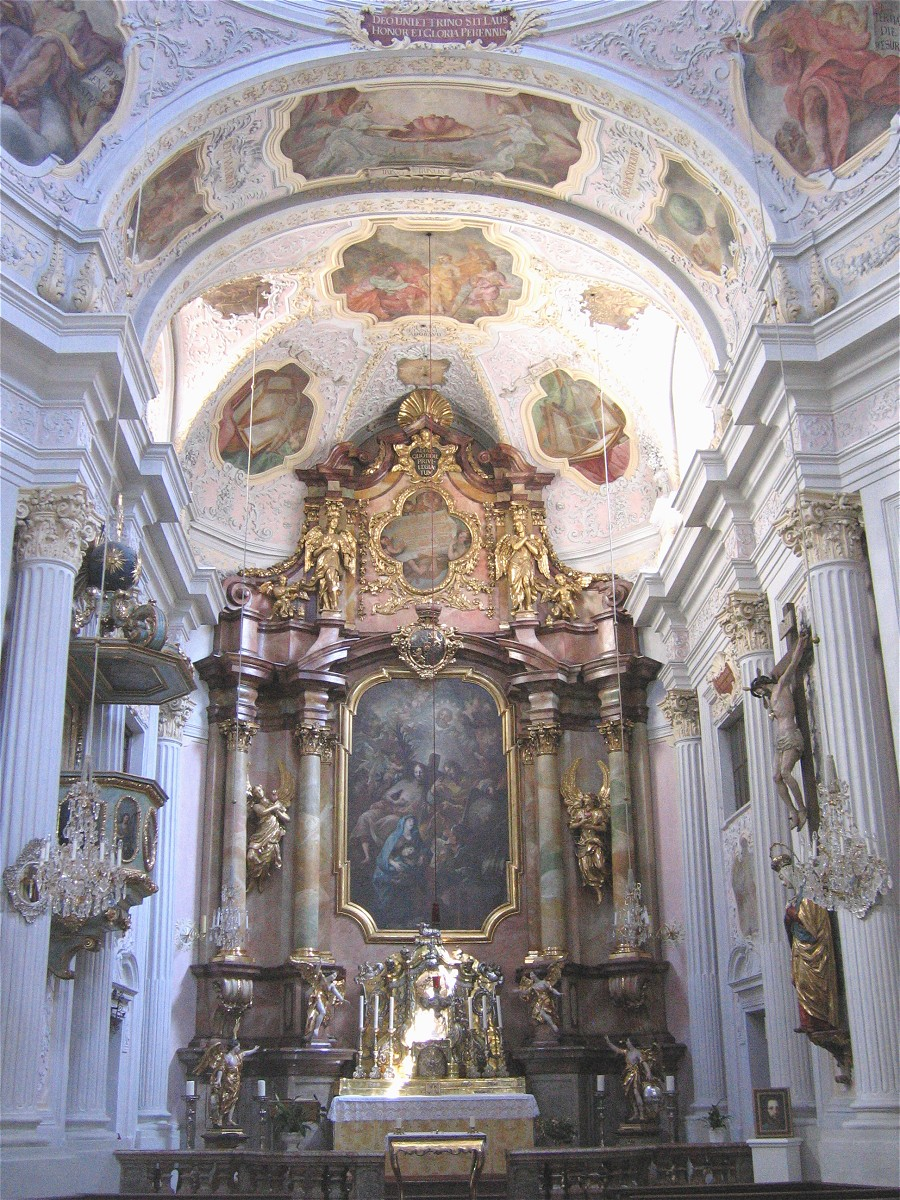
Trinity Church

The Trinity Church (German: Dreifaltigkeitskirche) is a religious building in Munich, southern Germany. It is a votive church (Note: A votive church ('votive' from Latin votum 'vow' or 'promise') is a church that was built as a sign of thanksgiving for salvation from an emergency or with a request for the fulfillment of a specific desire, and sometimes atonement (also known as an "expiatory chapel"). Often, the builder made a vow to have the church built if the prayer was heard. Votive churches also include so-called thanksgiving churches.) and was designed in Bavarian Baroque style according to plans from Giovanni Antonio Viscardi from 1711 to 1718. It is a monastery church of the Carmelites and a church of the Metropolitan parish of Our Blessed Lady. During the Second World War this was the only church in the center of Munich, which had been spared from destruction by bombs.

A pledge was kept (due to the prophecy of Maria Anna Lindmayr); people hoped to be spared by the Austrians during the Spanish Succession war.

== Architecture ==
The church is Munich's first church building in late baroque style. The central building, with its dome and elaborate entrance, was built after Viscardi's death in 1713 by Enrico Zuccalli. The double-faced south façade protrudes the front of the houses of the street. The polygonal main entrance is divided by columns and strong baroque cornices.

Important works by Cosmas Damian Asam (ceiling paintings in the dome), Joseph Ruffini, Andreas Faistenberger, Johann Baptist Straub and Johann Georg Baader can be admired inside. The spire which lost its steepletop in World War II is situated further north next to the former convent.

The patronal feast is All Saints Holy Trinity (the Sunday after Whitsun).

== See also ==
- 18th-century Western domes
