= Ruffins =

Ruffins is a surname. Notable people with the surname include:

- Kermit Ruffins (born 1964), American musician, singer, composer, and actor
- Moqut Ruffins (born 1984), American football player
- Reynold Ruffins (1930–2021), American artist

== See also ==
- Ruffin (disambiguation)
- Ruffini
