= Ruffin =

Ruffin may refer to:

== People ==
- Ruffin (name), list of people with the name

== Places ==
- Riffa, Bahrain, formerly known in English as Ruffin
- Ruffin, North Carolina
- Ruffin, South Carolina

== See also ==
- Tierra Ruffin-Pratt (born 1991), American basketball player
- Ruffins
- Rufin
