= Palais Porcia =

Coordinates: 48°08′26″N 11°34′29″E

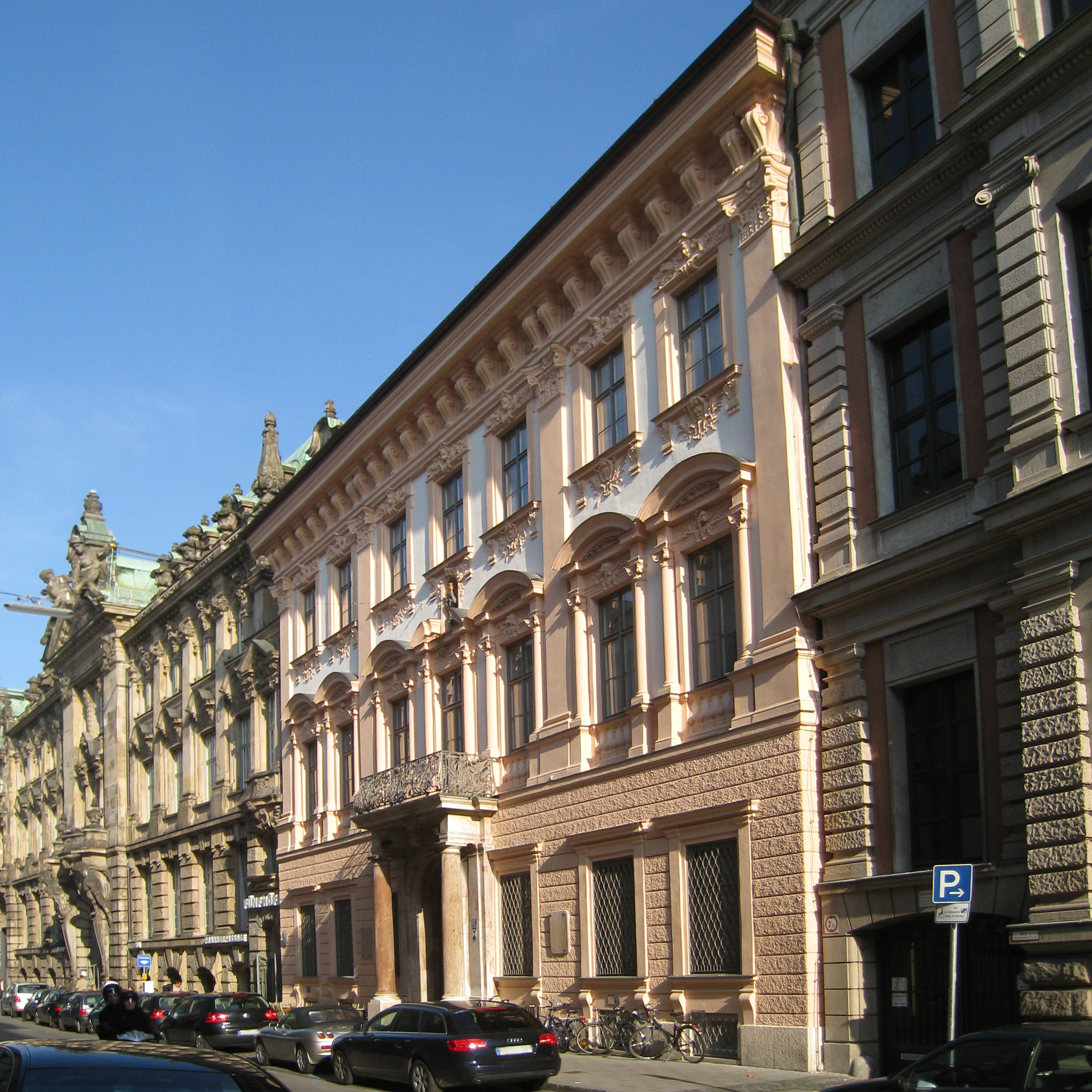
Palais Porcia after renovations 2008

The Palais Porcia is a Baroque mansion in Munich, southern Germany, which served as residence for Count Fugger. It is Munich's oldest still existing Baroque-style palace.

== Building style ==
Enrico Zuccalli built the mansion in Italian baroque style in 1693 for the Count Fugger. In 1710 it was bought by Count Törring and in 1731 by Elector Charles Albert. His architect François de Cuvilles restored the mansion in 1736 in Rococo style for the countess Topor-Morawitzka, a mistress of Charles Albert.

== History ==
The mansion was named after her husband, Prince Porcia. In 1819, a concert hall was integrated by Métivier for the "Museum", a cultural association which had acquired the mansion. In 1934, the Palais Porcia was acquired by a bank. The restoration after the destruction during World War II took place in 1950–1952.

After renovations it received a prize by the city of Munich, the Fassadenpreis der Landeshauptstadt München of 2008, for its refurbished facade.
