= Giovanni Antonio Viscardi =

Swiss architect (1645–1713)

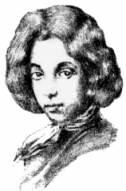
- Born: December 27, 1645; San Vittore, Switzerland
- Died: 9 September 1713 (aged 67); Munich, Holy Roman Empire
- Occupation: Architect

Giovanni Antonio Viscardi (27 December 1645 – 9 September 1713) was a Swiss architect of the baroque, who worked mostly in Bavaria.

== Biography ==
=== Early life and education ===
Viscardi was born on 27 December 1645, in San Vittore, Switzerland. He was descended from a family which provided several architects who had worked in Bavaria, Styria and Mainz. His father, Bartolomeo Viscardi (1599–1654), was summoned to Munich by Maximilian I, Elector of Bavaria, in 1630 and worked in the Innviertel area and in Lower Bavaria from 1634. Giovanni Antonio completed his apprenticeship in the building trade, at that time strongly influenced by Italian architectural models, in the Swiss canton of Grisons.

He is first mentioned in documents in connection with the construction in 1674 of the pilgrimage church at Altötting, Lower Bavaria, where he acted as clerk of works for Enrico Zuccalli. It must have been on Zuccalli's recommendation that Viscardi eventually went to Munich in 1677.

=== Court architect of Bavaria ===
In 1678 he was appointed court master mason and in 1685 court architect. His first years in office were taken up with small-scale but varied duties for the court building office, but he was ousted in 1689 after disputes with Zuccalli and had to make his way as an independent architect until 1702. Viscardi then emerged as a building contractor employing up to 150 journeymen and clerks of works from both Switzerland and Bavaria. He dominated building activity in Munich and a large surrounding area, proving himself a notable church architect. After he had designed extensive monastic buildings for the Cistercian abbey of Fürstenfeld (built 1691–9 by Martin Guneztrhainer (d. 1699), a master mason from Munich), he had a three-year term of office as architect to the Theatine Order in Munich. The Jesuits there commissioned him to extend their college and build an assembly hall, and he also did work for the nobility and the upper middle classes.

From c. 1700 he built various summer residences and country houses in Munich and the surrounding area. Although few of these have survived, they exerted a considerable influence on suburban secular architecture in Bavaria during the late Baroque period. The former Premonstratensian monastery church at Neustift (now the parish church of Saints Peter and Paul, Freising) had a basilica-type plan designed by Viscardi and built by Giovanni Giacomo Maffioli (d. 1721) in 1700–21. The façade was flat and articulated by pilasters, while the interior was of the wall buttress type (Wandpfeilerkirche), with no galleries but otherwise deeply modelled.

The rebuilding (1700–02) of the Jesuit church of Saint Salvator, Augsburg, was followed by designs for the former Cistercian abbey church of Maria Himmelfahrt in Fürstenfeld, where Viscardi produced another variation of the type of construction used at Neustift, with internal wall pillars displaying pairs of engaged columns. There are two tiers of galleries above the side chapels, the lower one very narrow; the transverse vaults above them are almost as high as the crown of the nave vault.

Viscardi's pilgrimage church of Mariahilf in Freystadt, Upper Palatinate, built between 1700 and 1710, has a ground-plan in the form of a Greek cross. Viscardi started from the central plan typical of the Roman High Baroque that he had learned from Zuccalli and his design for the pilgrimage church at Altötting and combined this with the local building tradition. He developed an arcaded octagonal space covered with a dome, which served as a model for 18th-century Bavarian country churches. The salient features of the interior of the Mariahilf are the dominating vault of the dome and the contrast between the powerfully three-dimensional emphasis created by the wall pillars and the smooth, unarticulated planarity of the external walls.

=== Later years ===
After his reinstatement as court architect to Elector Maximilian II Emanuel of Bavaria in 1702, Viscardi was put in charge of the large building schemes at Schleissheim Palace and Nymphenburg Palace in Munich. Although Bavaria was under imperial Austrian administration, he became chief court architect in 1706, after Zuccalli's dismissal.

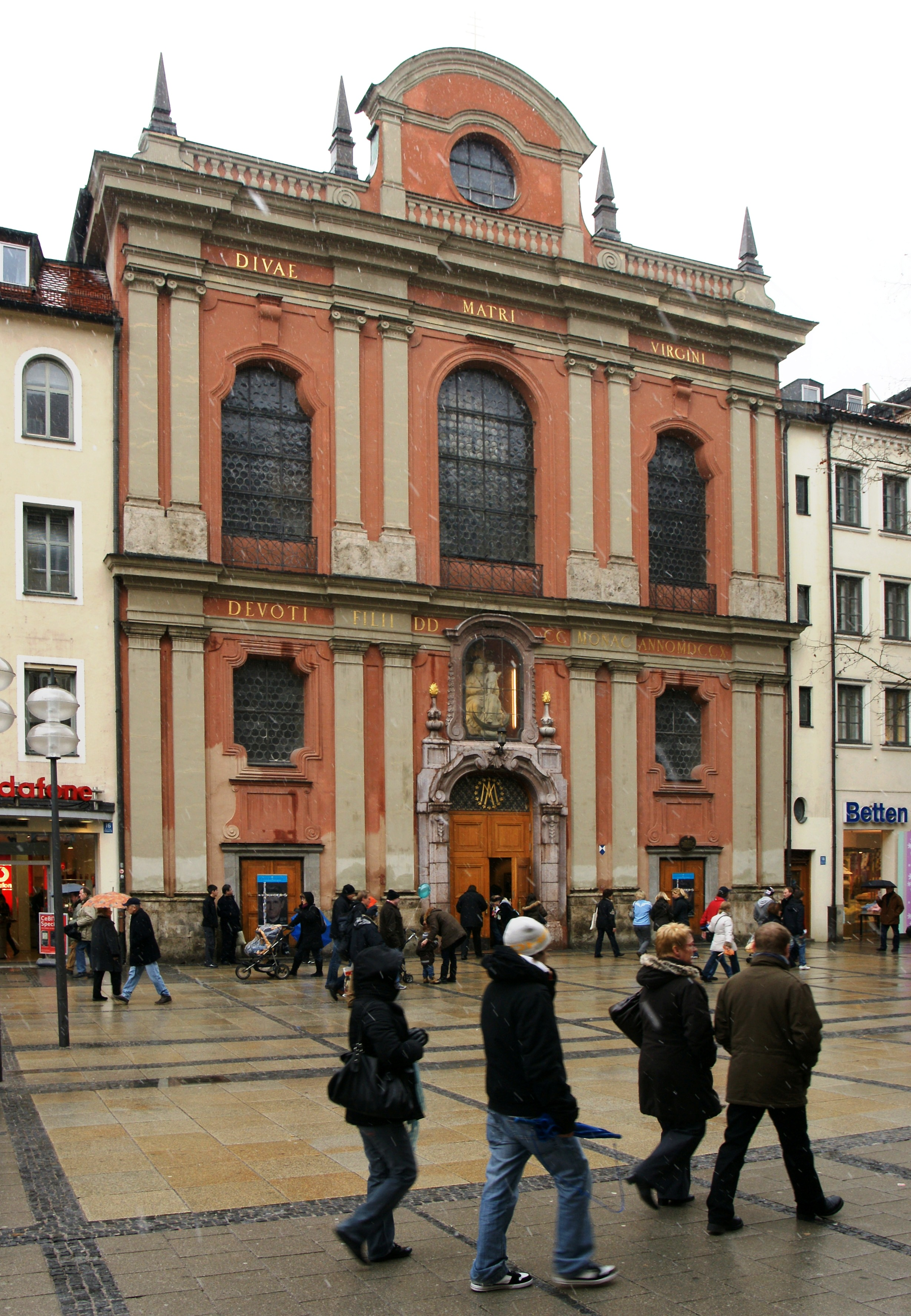
Der Bürgersaal in Munich

His last years were filled with official duties and work as an expert consultant in the court building service. The Bürgersaalkirche (1709–11), Munich, was the result of collaboration with Johann Andreas Wolff, court painter in Munich. Viscardi's Dreifaltigkeitskirche (1711–18), Munich, is another notable example of the complex spatial organization that he had achieved in his church at Freystadt, on a reduced scale but in a more concentrated form. In its organization of space it represents the transition from Italian Baroque to Bavarian Late Baroque. The large frescoes in the dome and the altar structures contribute substantially to the spatial impression. The two-storey façade of the Dreifaltigkeitskirche has a superelevated middle section that juts out in the form of a bay, with columns marking the points of return of the strongly vertical components of the façade, an innovative solution that heralded the Rococo style in southern Germany. This entrance bay is echoed internally by an apse at the back of the deep choir, which leads off from a square nave roofed by a dome on pendentives, broken by four windows above a circular cornice. The transepts are stubby and flat-ended.

Viscardi died on 9 September 1713, aged 67, in Munich, while still in office.

Most of Viscardi's work comprises simple functional buildings in the typical style of a master builder from the Grisons, with a feeling for simple cubic masses composed of a unified type of wall surface with flat articulation. He was adept at adjusting to the indigenous Bavarian style and was important not only for the development of centrally planned religious buildings in Bavaria but also for the formation of a sound building trade.

== Chief works ==
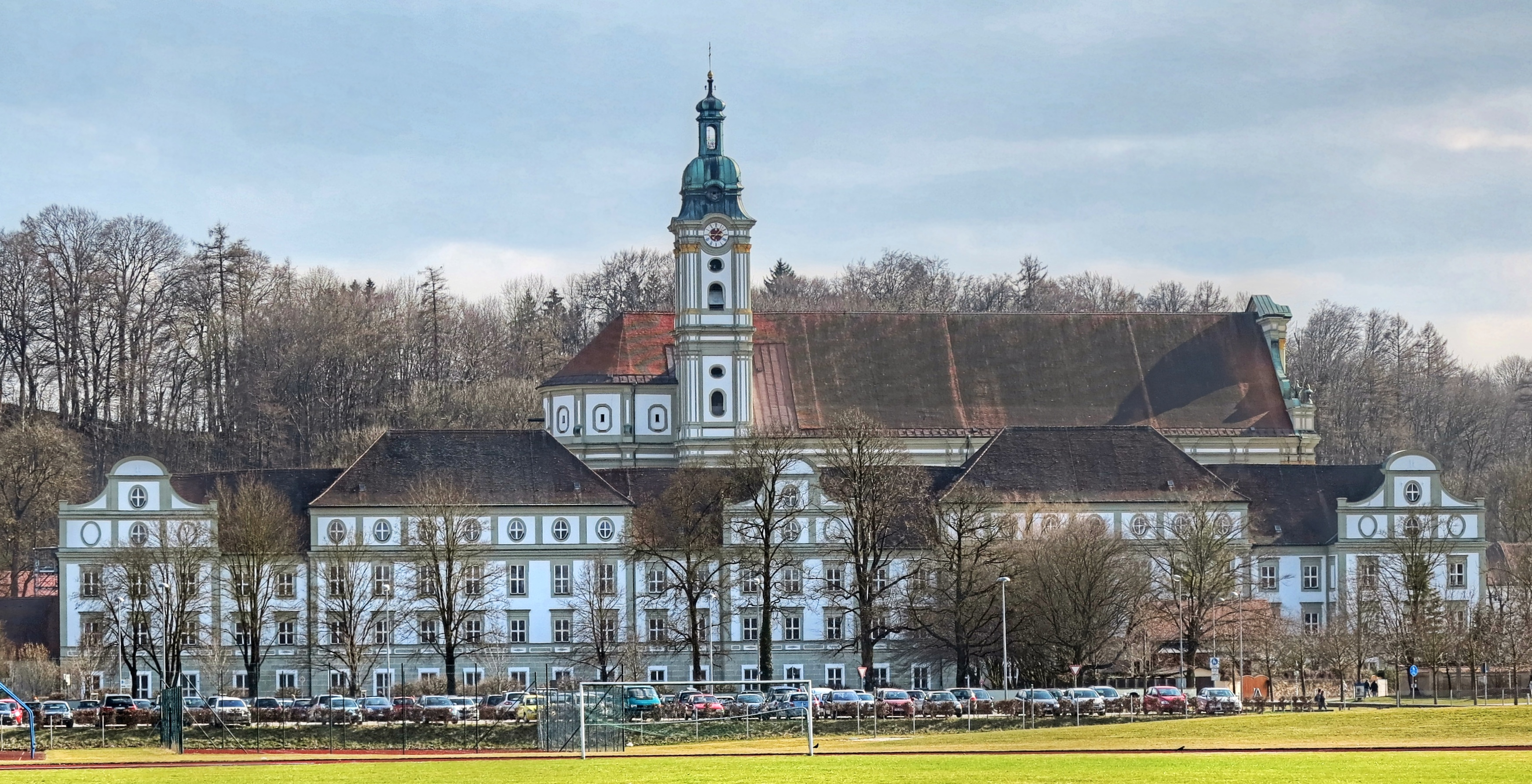
Kloster Fürstenfeld

- Mariahilfkirche at Freystadt Abbey (1700–08)
- New church of St. Mary of Fürstenfeld Abbey (1701-?) (completed in 1747).)
- Schäftlarn Abbey
- Expansion of Benediktbeuern Abbey
- Expansion of the Palace of Nymphenburg (1702 - )
- Bürgersaal in Munich (1709/1710)
- Dreifaltigkeitskirche in Munich (1711–1714).)
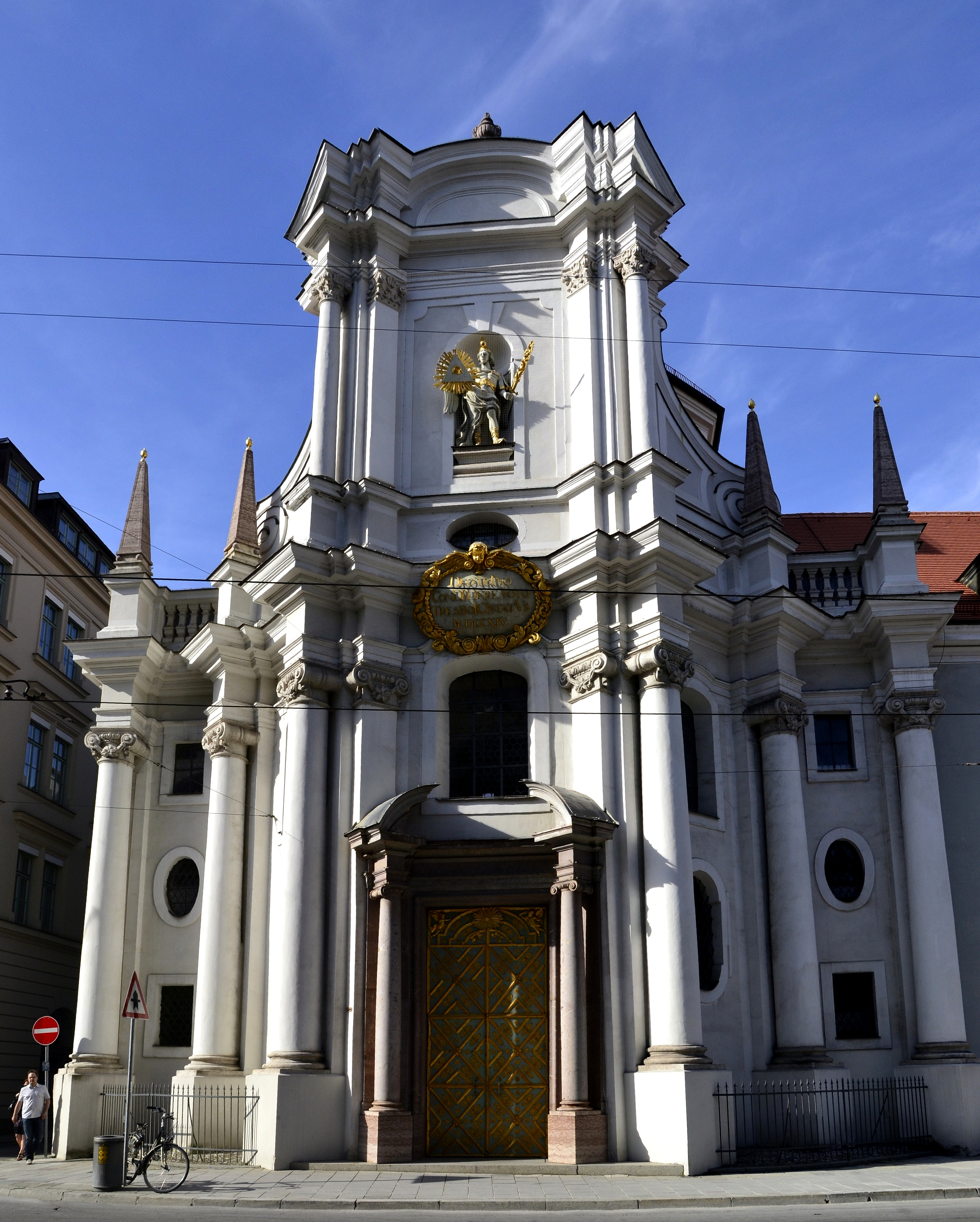
Dreifaltigkeitskirche (Trinity Church) in Munich

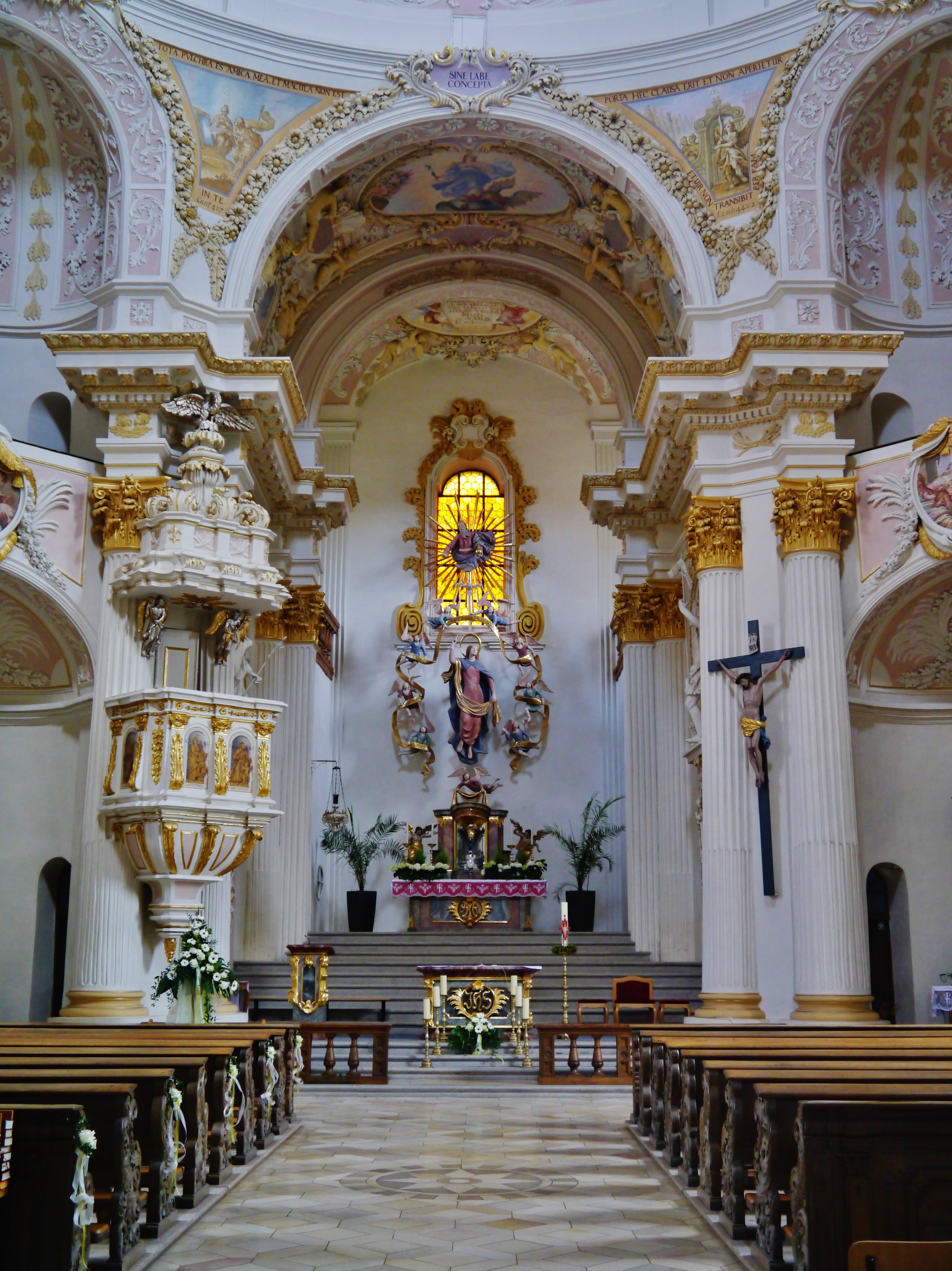
Interior of Maria Hilf, Freystadt

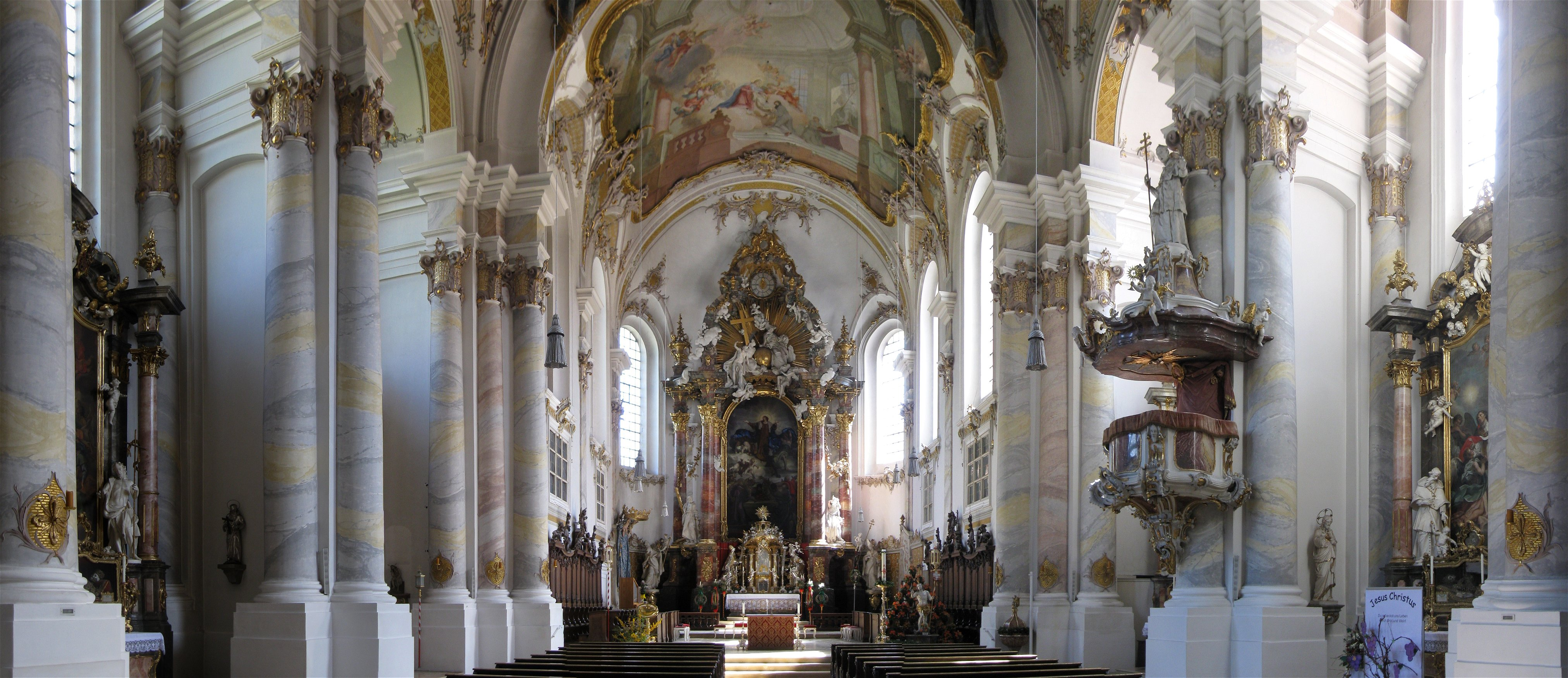
Interiors of the church of Saints Peter and Paul, Freising
