= Rupert Mayer =

German Jesuit priest

Blessed Rupert Mayer SJ
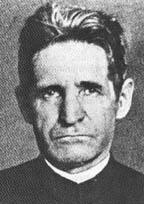

Martyr
- Born: 23 January 1876; Stuttgart, Germany
- Died: 1 November 1945 (aged 69); Munich, Germany
- Venerated in: Roman Catholic Church
- Beatified: 3 May 1987, Munich by Pope John Paul II
- Feast: 3 November (several German dioceses, Jesuit order), 5 November (Diocese of Eichstätt)

Rupert Mayer (23 January 1876 – 1 November 1945) was a Jesuit priest and a leading figure of the German resistance to Nazism in Munich. In 1987, he was beatified by Pope John Paul II.

== Early life ==
Mayer was born in Stuttgart and grew up there as one of five siblings. He finished his secondary education in 1894 and studied philosophy and theology in Freiburg, Switzerland; Munich; and Tübingen. He was a member of A.V. Guestfalia Tübingen and K.D.St.V. Aenania München, two Studentenverbindungen that belonged to the Cartellverband der katholischen deutschen Studentenverbindungen. In 1899, he was ordained a priest and served for a year as an assistant pastor in Spaichingen before joining the Society of Jesus in Feldkirch, Vorarlberg, Austria (then Austria-Hungary) in 1900. After his novitiate, he went to the Netherlands for further studies between 1906 and 1911, and then moved around Germany, Switzerland and the Netherlands, preaching missions in many parishes. In 1912, he was transferred to Munich, where his ministry was largely to migrants who had come to the city seeking employment.

== Army chaplain ==
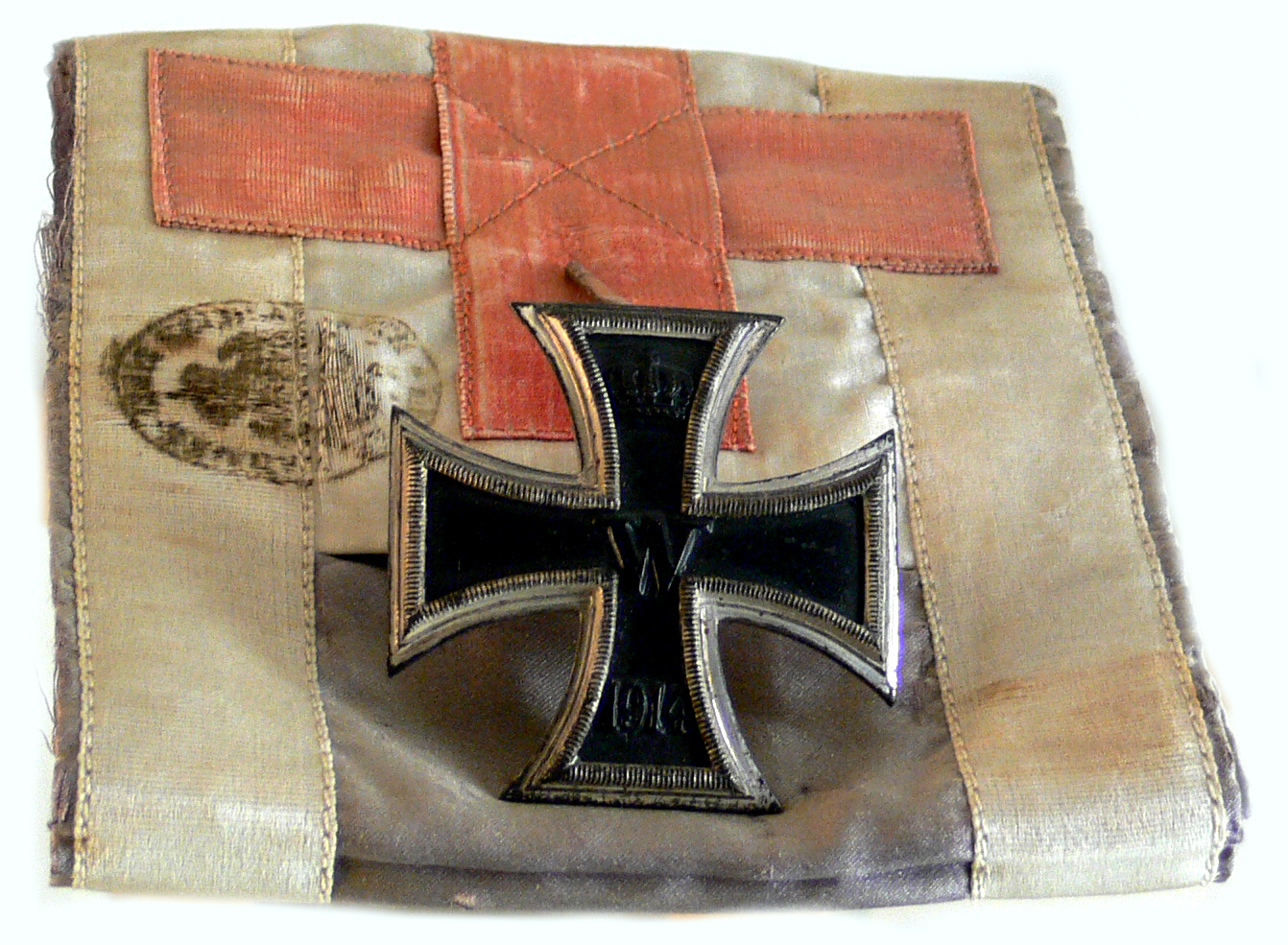
Iron Cross medal of Fr. Rupert Mayer, exhibited in the Bürgersaalkirche of Munich

From 1914, Mayer volunteered as a chaplain in the First World War. He was initially assigned to a camp hospital; but was later made a Field Captain and sent to the fronts in France, Poland and Romania as chaplain to a division of soldiers. His bravery was legendary and he was held in great esteem by the soldiers. When there was fighting at the front, Mayer would be found himself crawling along the ground from one soldier to the next talking to them, and administering the sacraments to them. In December 1915, Mayer was the first chaplain to win the Iron Cross for bravery in recognition of his work with the soldiers at the front. In December 1916, he lost his left leg after it was injured in a grenade attack. He returned to Munich to convalesce and was referred to as the Limping Priest.

Mayer worked managing a clerical retreat, as a preacher, and as of 1921 as a leader of the men's sodality in Munich. Mayer introduced Sunday Masses at the main railway terminal for the convenience of travellers.

== Protest against the Nazis ==
In January 1933, when Adolf Hitler became Chancellor of Germany, he began to close church-affiliated schools and started a campaign to discredit the religious orders in Germany. Mayer spoke out against this persecution from the pulpit of St. Michael's in downtown Munich and because he was a powerful influence in the city, the Nazis could not tolerate such a force to oppose them. On 16 May 1937, the Gestapo ordered Mayer to stop speaking in public which he obeyed, but he continued to preach in church.

Mayer spoke out against anti-Catholic baiting campaigns and fought against Nazi church policy. Since he believed that a Catholic could not be a National Socialist, conflict inevitably arose between him and the Nazis. He preached that Man must obey God more than men. His protests against the Nazis landed him several times in Landsberg prison. Mayer resolutely spoke out against the Nazi régime's evil in his lectures and sermons. On 5 June 1937, he was arrested and found himself in "protective custody" in Stadelheim Prison for six weeks. When he became the target of defamatory attacks on the part of the Nazis, his Jesuit superiors allowed him to return to the pulpit to defend himself against slanders that the Nazis had made during his silence. He was re-arrested and served a sentence of five months.

Mayer was arrested again on 3 November 1939 and sent to Sachsenhausen concentration camp under the Kanzelparagraphen, a series of 19th-century laws that forbade the clergy to make political statements. He was released from there on the condition of a broad ban on preaching. The sixty-three-year-old priest developed heart problems. From late 1944, he was interned in Ettal Abbey, mainly because the Nazis were afraid that he would die in the concentration camp, and thus become a martyr. He remained there until liberated by the US forces in May 1945.

A United States officer returned him to Munich, where he resumed his duties at St. Michael's Church. Mayer died on his feet on 1 November 1945 of a stroke, while he was celebrating 8:00 AM Mass, on the feast of All Saints' Day in St. Michael's in Munich. Accompanied by thousands of mourners, Mayer was first buried at the Jesuit cemetery in Pullach. Due to the steady stream of pilgrims, his remains were moved to Munich in 1948 and were reburied in the "Lower Church" of the Bürgersaalkirche.

== Veneration ==
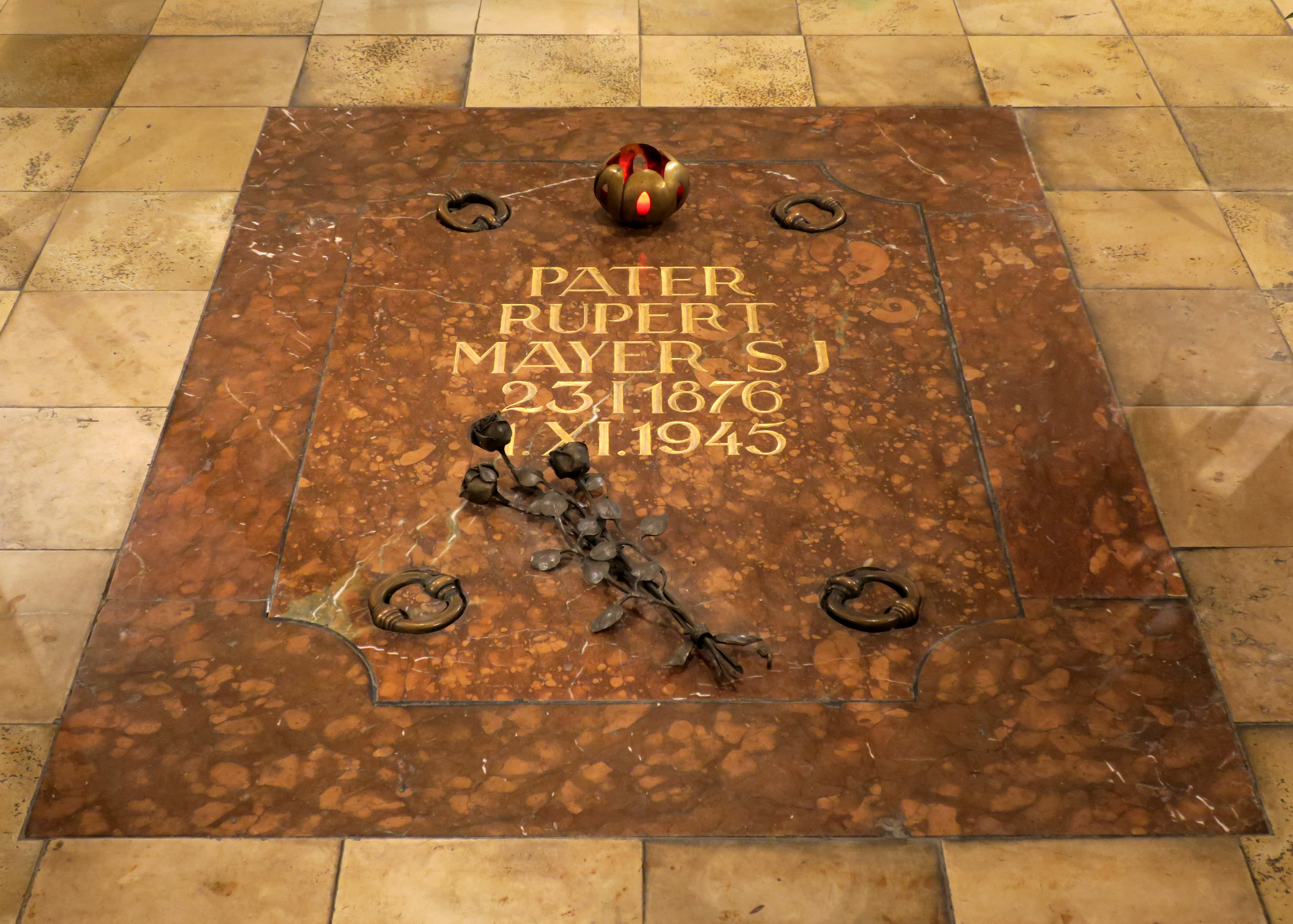
Rupert Mayer's grave in the Bürgersaalkirche's "Lower Church"

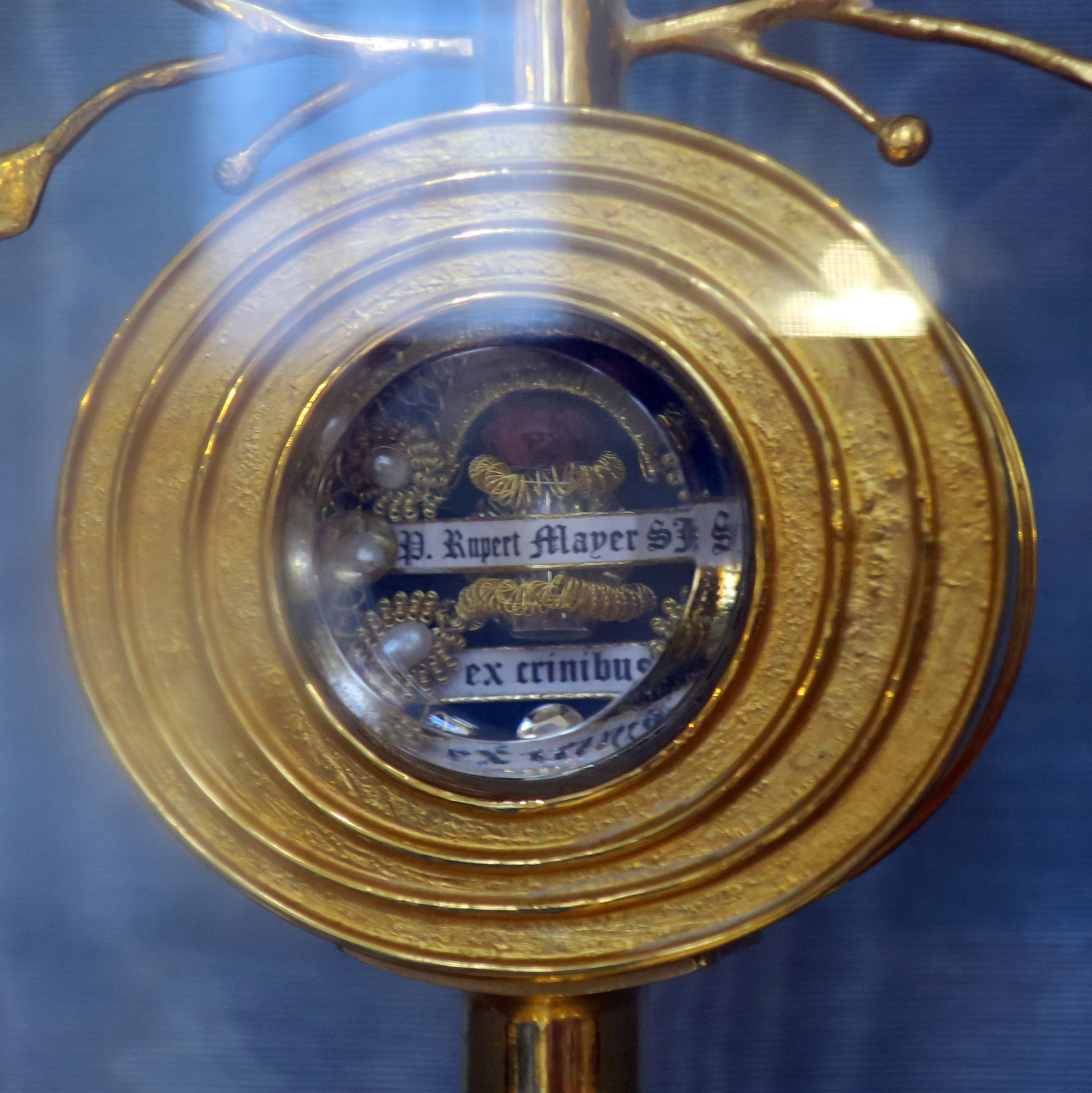
Rupert Mayer's hair venerated as a relic in the Bürgersaalkirche

Since his death in 1945, Mayer's followers called for his beatification. On 26 September 1951, Cardinal Michael von Faulhaber opened the information process in the Archdiocese of Munich and Freising regarding the call to sanctity and virtues. In 1951, Jesuit provincial Otto Faller completed and formally forwarded the beatification information to Rome.

In 1956, Pope Pius XII, who had personally known Rupert Mayer during his time as nuncio in Munich, awarded him the title Servant of God. Under Pope John XXIII, the beatification process was initiated, the results of which were formally accepted by Pope Paul VI in 1971. Under Pope John Paul II, the decree of 'heroic virtue' was issued in 1983. Mayer was beatified by Pope John Paul II on 3 May 1987 in Munich. His feast day is 3 November.

== Legacy ==
In Bavaria, numerous streets are named after Father Mayer. In 1954, the Cartell Rupert Mayer (CRM) was founded. It was a further development of the first Christliche Loge (CL) founded in Munich in 1946. The mediaeval Dombauhütten Logen may be considered its forerunner. In Pullach, Bavaria, a public school, a Realschule and a Gymnasium bear his name.

In Cebu City, Philippines, Sacred Heart School - Ateneo de Cebu, has a section named after him. Another Jesuit school in the Philippines, Xavier University - Ateneo de Cagayan, has a high school section that bears his name. Regis Jesuit High School in Aurora, Colorado dedicated the chapel to him. The parish church of Oberbozen (Soprabolzano) on South Tyrol's Ritten, inaugurated in 1991, has been dedicated to P. Rupert Mayer. In 2006 Fordham University dedicated a chapel in his name at their Lincoln Center campus in Manhattan, New York. A missionary school is named after him in Zimbabwe. Ateneo de Davao University's Senior High School in the Philippines has a senior high school section named after him.

In 1988 he was pictured on a German postage stamp with Edith Stein in honour of their beatifications.

In 2014 a movie was made of his life, called Father Rupert Mayer and starring Oliver Gruber. The movie can be seen on YouTube.

== Prayer of Rupert Mayer ==
The following text come from the song produced by Bukas Palad Music Ministry:

Lord, what You will let it be so
Where You will there we will go
What is Your will help us to know

Lord, when You will the time is right
In You there's joy in strife
For Your will I'll give my life

To ease Your burden brings no pain
To forego all for You is gain
As long as I in You remain

REFRAIN:
Because You will it, it is best
Because You will it, we are blest
Till in Your hands our hearts find rest
Till in Your hands our hearts find rest
