= Bürgersaalkirche =

Church in Munich, Germany

Coordinates: 48°08′20″N 11°34′6″E

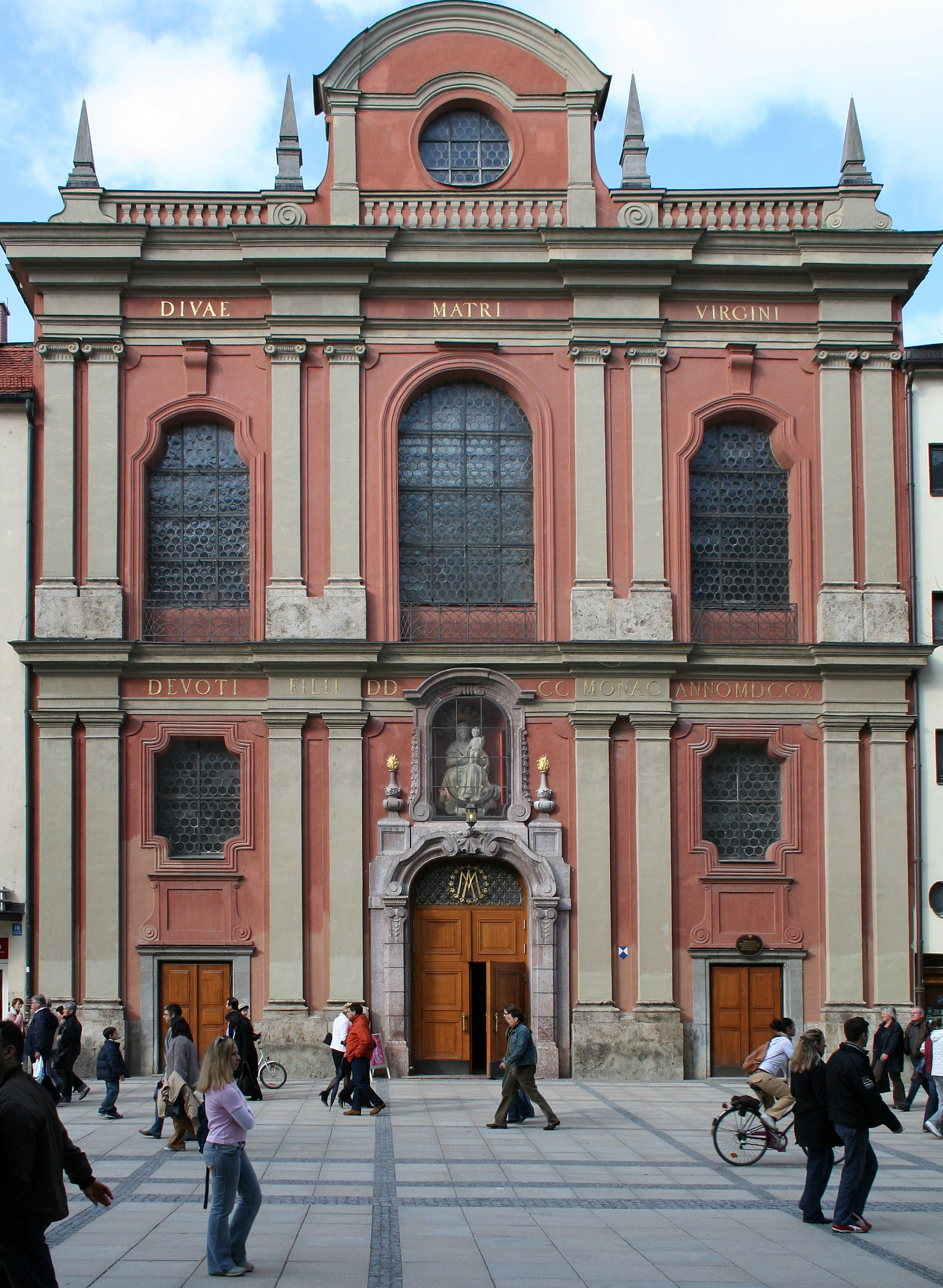
Bürgersaal Munich

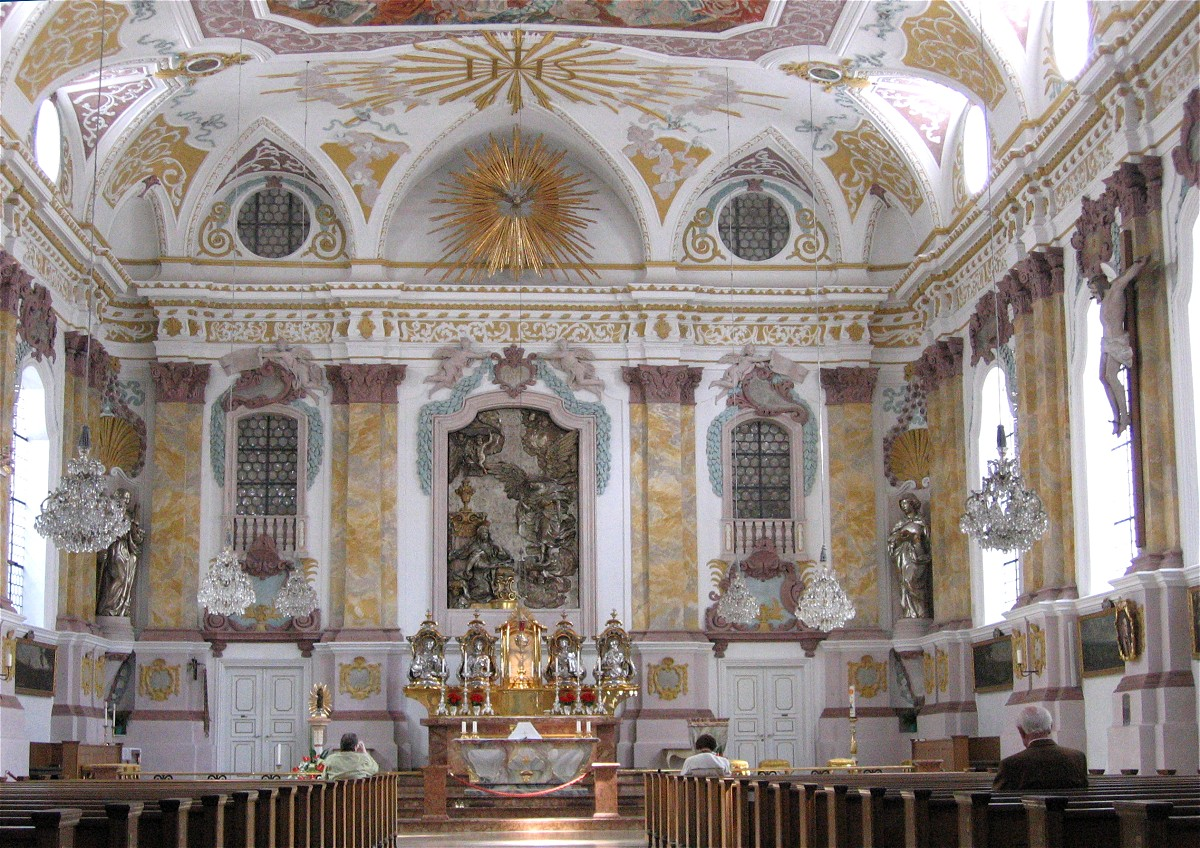
High altar upper church

The Bürgersaal (English: "Citizen's Hall") is a historical building in Munich, Germany. Also known as Bürgersaalkirche since the consecration of the altar on May 13, 1778, it is the prayer and meeting room of the Marian Men Congregation "Annunciation". It was built in 1709/1710 to a design by Giovanni Antonio Viscardi.

== Architecture ==
The church is divided into an upper church on the upper floor and a lower church on the lower floor. The baroque façade mirrors this inside division of the construction towards the outside. Above the entrance stands a figure of the enthroned Madonna and Child. On the upper floor was the prayer room, which then already since 1778 has been used as a church. A masterpiece of the interior decoration is the sculpture of the Guardian Angel with child from Ignaz Günther from 1763 and a relief of Andreas Faistenberger from 1710 from the former high altar which was destroyed in World War II. On the lower floor is the grave of Rupert Mayer.

== See also ==
- List of Jesuit sites
