= Ettal Abbey =

Monastery in Ettal, Bavaria, Germany

Coordinates: 47°34′18″N 11°05′42″E

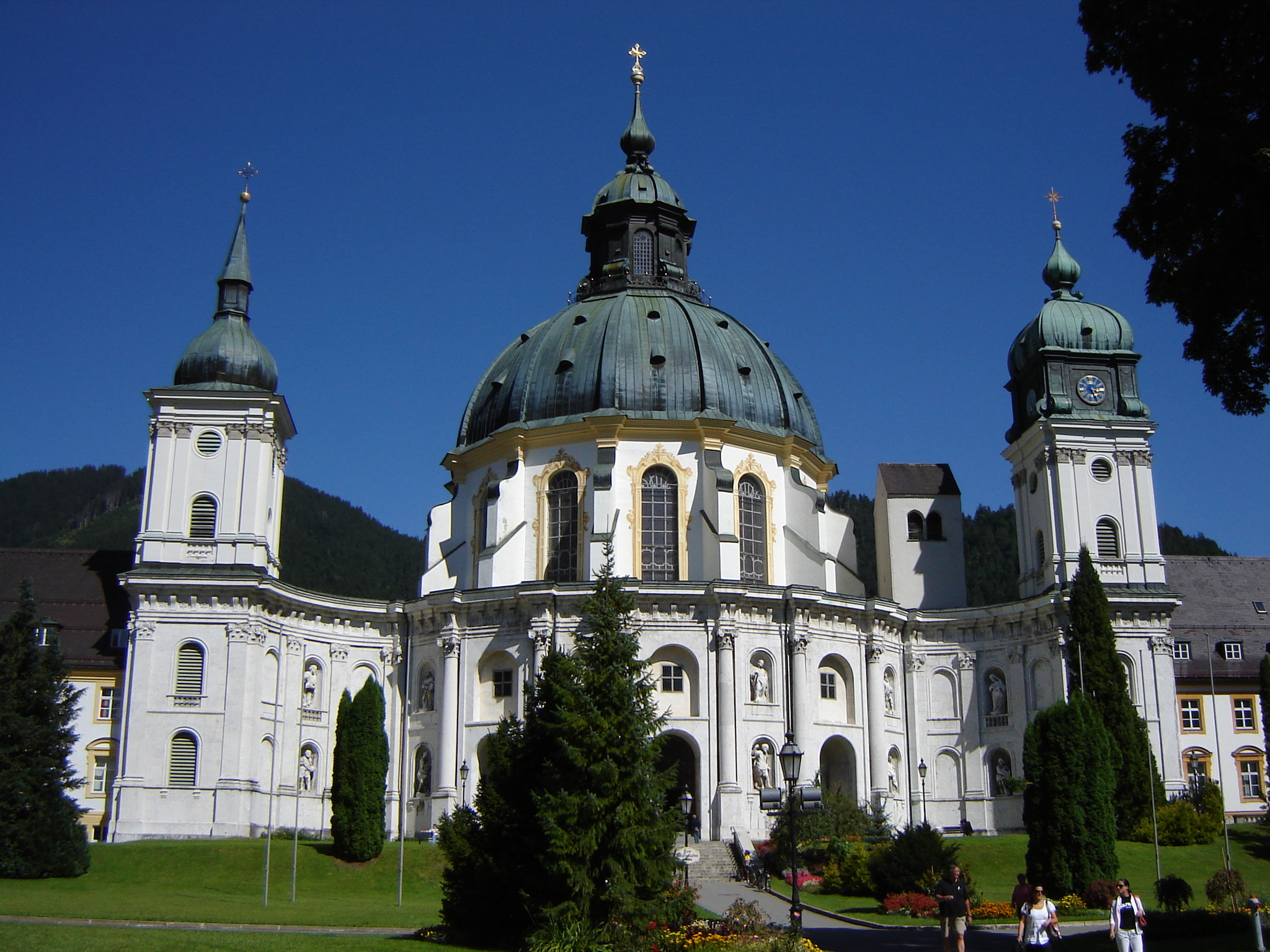
Ettal Abbey church facade

Ettal Abbey (German: Kloster Ettal) is a Benedictine monastery in the village of Ettal close to Oberammergau and Garmisch-Partenkirchen in Bavaria, Germany. With a community (as of 2005) of more than 50 monks, with another five at Wechselburg, the Abbey is one of the largest Benedictine houses and is a major attraction for visitors.

== History ==
=== Middle Ages and Early Modern period ===
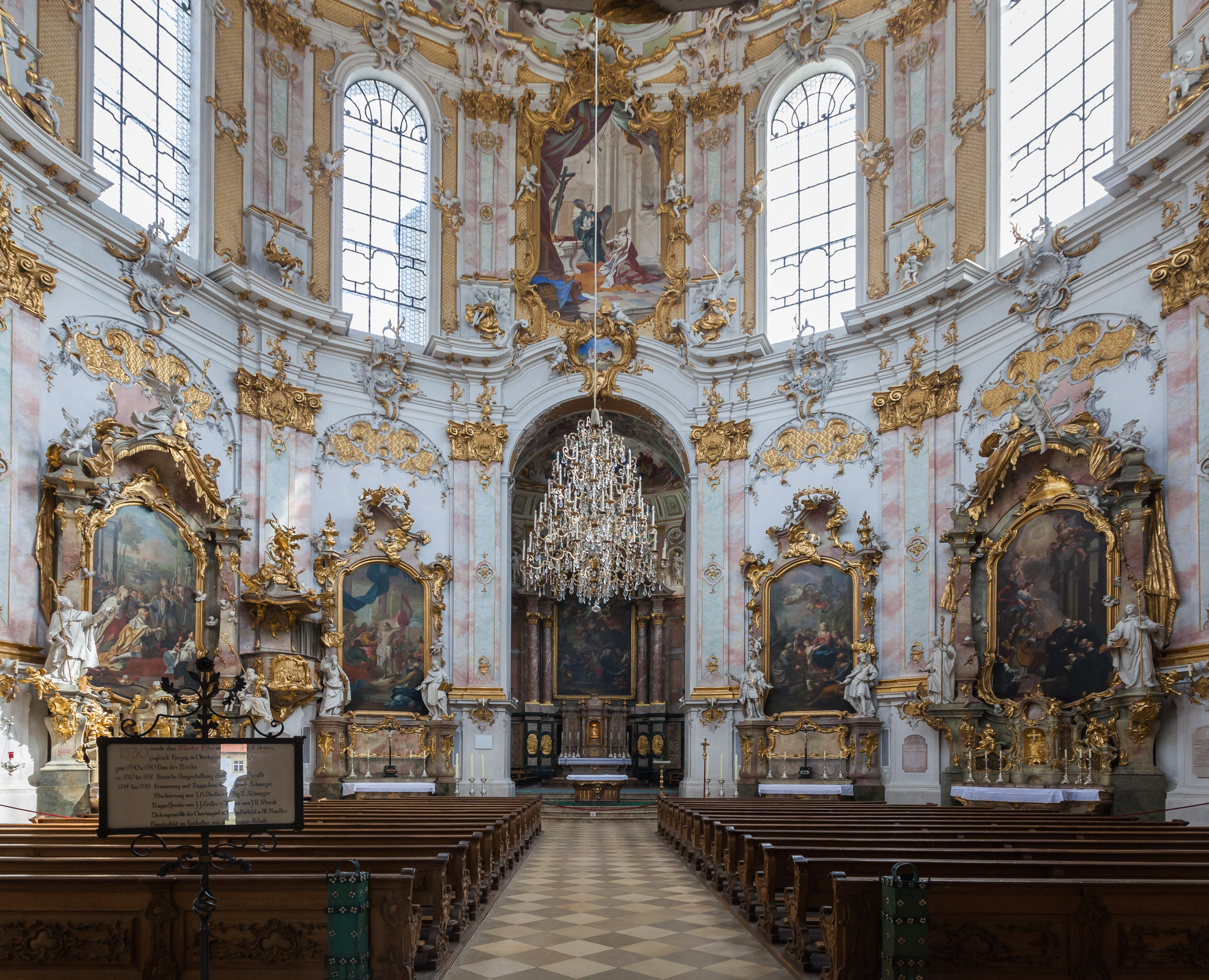
Church interior

Ettal Abbey was founded on 28 April 1330, Saint Vitalis of Milan's day, by Emperor Ludwig the Bavarian in the Graswang valley, in fulfilment of an vow, on his return from his coronation in Rome, on a site of strategic importance on the primary trade route between Italy and Augsburg. The foundation legend is that Ludwig's horse genuflected three times on the site of the original church building, where a marble statuette of the Madonna and Child ("Frau Stifterin" or the "Ettal Madonna") now stands. The statuette was brought by Ludwig from Pisa as a gift for his new foundation. It soon became an object of pilgrimage. The church is dedicated to the Assumption of the Blessed Virgin.

The foundation originally consisted of a Benedictine double monastery – a community for men and another for women – and also a house of the Teutonic Knights.

The original Gothic abbey church, built between 1330 and 1370, was a modest structure in comparison to the great churches of medieval Bavaria.

The abbey suffered great damage during the Reformation at the hands of the troops of Maurice of Saxony, but survived the troubles of the Thirty Years' War (1618–1648).

=== Baroque expansion ===
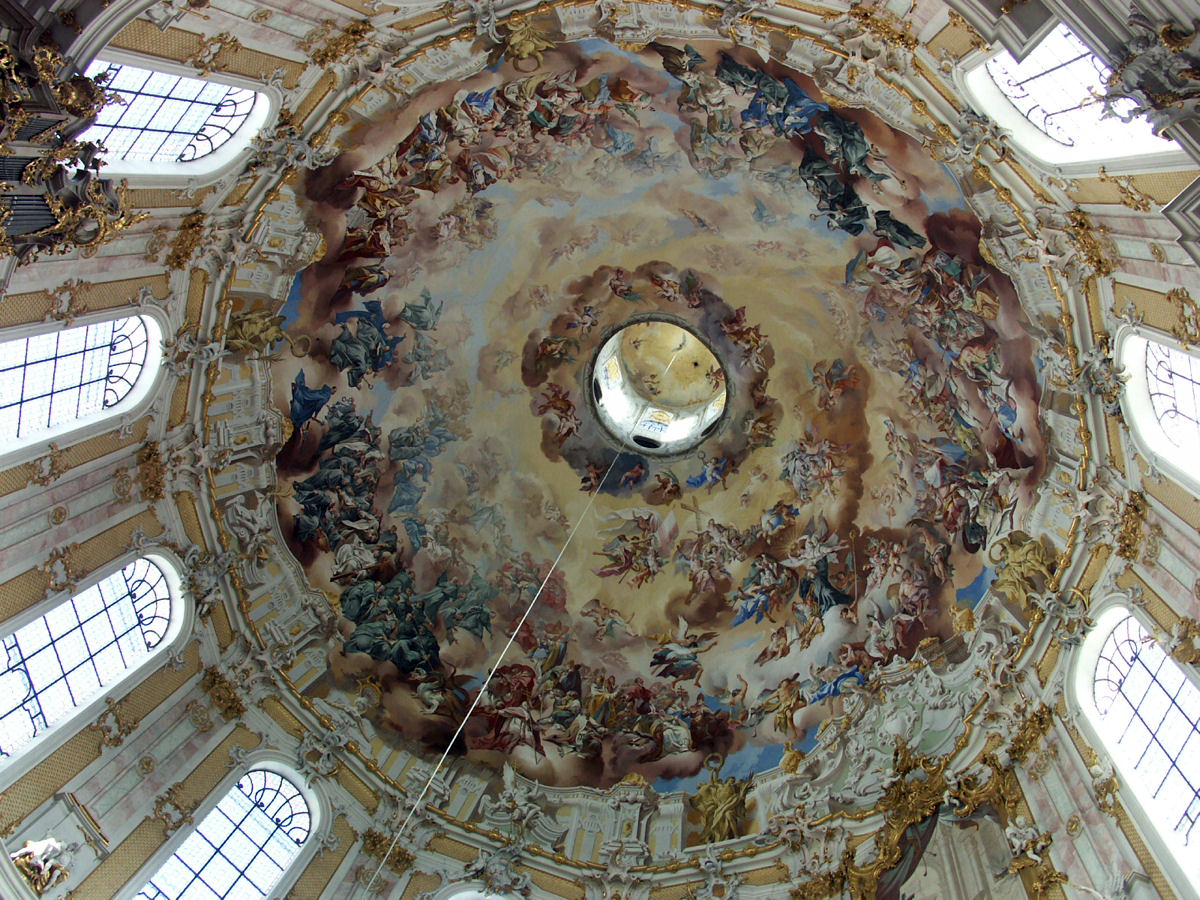
Frescos under the dome

In 1709, under Abbot Placidus II Seiz, the golden age of Ettal began with the establishment of the "Knights' Academy" ("Ritterakademie"), which developed into a highly successful school and began the educational tradition of the abbey. In 1744, the abbey and the abbey church were largely destroyed in a fire. The subsequent spectacular re-building in the Baroque style, with a double-shelled dome, was to the plans of Enrico Zuccalli, a Swiss-Italian architect working in Munich, who had studied with Bernini. The decoration was primarily carried out by Josef Schmutzer of the Wessobrunn School of stuccoists and Johann Baptist Straub, who was responsible for the altars and the chancel.

Ettal's importance as a place of pilgrimage grew with the new buildings and it became one of the most important monasteries in the Alpine region.

=== Secularization ===
The abbey was dissolved in 1803 during the secularization of church property in Bavaria. The site was acquired in 1809 by Josef von Elbling and sold by his descendants in 1856 to Count Pappenheim. Some small building works were completed during the 19th century, principally the renovation of the façade and the twin bell towers.

=== Second foundation ===
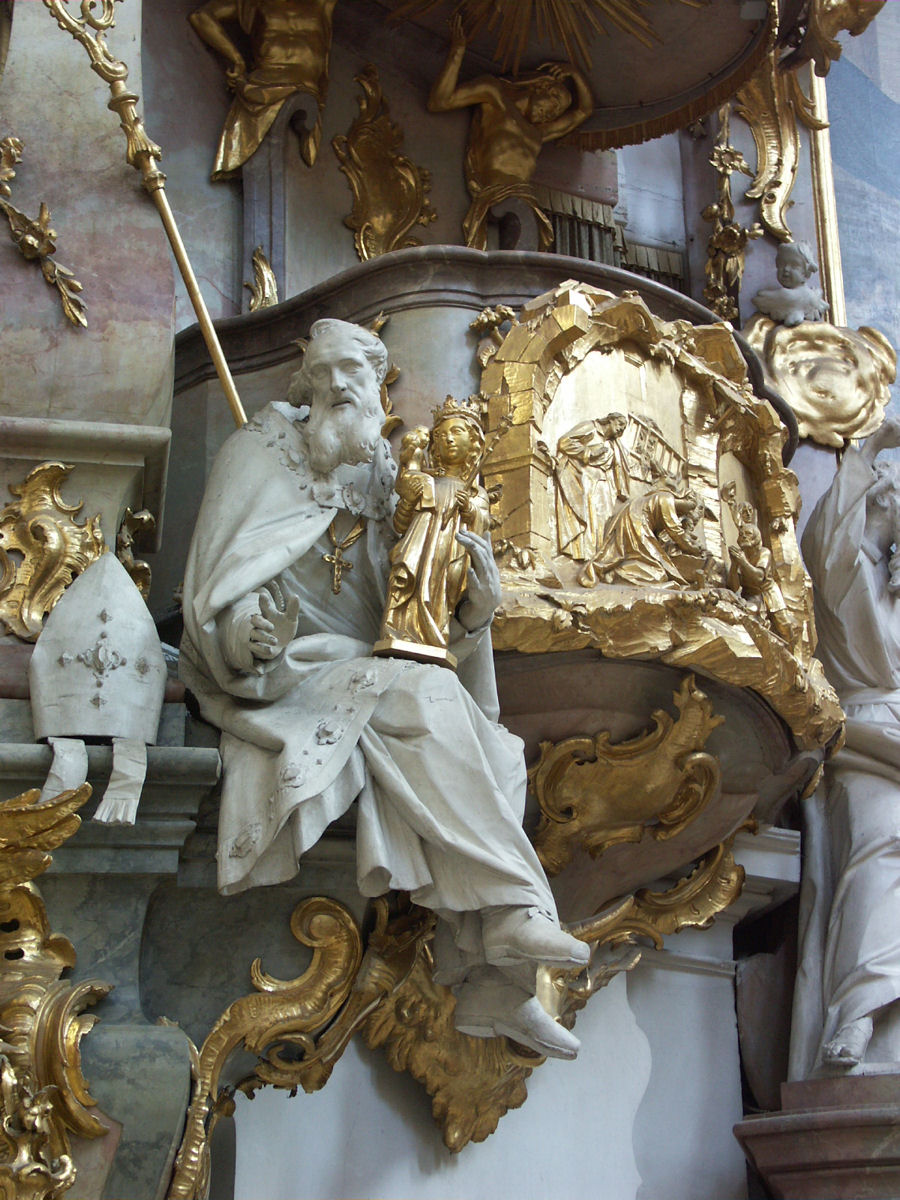
Statue on the pulpit

In 1898, the buildings were acquired by Baron Theodor von Cramer-Klett and, in 1900, given to the Benedictines of Scheyern Abbey, who re-founded the monastery here. It has been a member of the Bavarian Congregation of the Benedictine Confederation since 1900. The abbey church of the Ascension was declared a basilica minor in 1920.

During the winter of 1940–1941, the German pastor and theologian Dietrich Bonhoeffer (1906–1945) spent some months at the monastery as the friend and guest of the Abbot. Like Bonhoeffer, a number of those in the Ettal community were involved in the conspiracy against Hitler. While at Ettal, Bonhoeffer also worked on his book Ethics. Catholic priest Rupert Mayer was kept at the Abbey under house arrest from 1939 to 1945 by the Nazis to prevent him from further anti-Nazi preaching.

In 1993, Ettal re-founded the former Wechselburg Abbey in Saxony, an old monastery of the Augustinian Canons, as a Benedictine priory.

Ettal maintains a Byzantine Institute. The abbot of Ettal, Joannes Hoeck, made a significant contribution on the role of Patriarchs in Church government at the Second Vatican Council.

=== Sex abuse scandal ===
In early 2010, ten priests at the Ettal Abbey boarding school were accused of sadistic beatings, molestation, or making sexual advances on boys as well as sadism. In March 2010, authorities raided the monastery as part of a probe into allegations that priests sexually abused children there. By an Apostolic Visitation and an independent investigation, these allegations have been surveyed and consequences have been drafted. The major part of the alleged abuses took place in the late 1960s, 1970s and early 1980s. Both the monastery's Abbot Barnabas Bögle and the head of the school Maurus Kraß both resigned in February 2010 after being pressured to do so by Munich Archbishop Reinhard Marx. However, Bögle was re-elected Abbot in July 2010 and Kraß was later reinstated by the Bavarian Education Ministry. On September 6, 2011, the monastery agreed to pay €700,000 to 70 former pupils who were victims of abuse, with each victim receiving between €5,000 and €20,000 each in compensation.

== Economy ==
The monastery runs a brewery, Benediktiner Weissbräu, a distillery, a bookstore, an art publishing house, a hotel, a cheese factory joint venture, and several smaller companies. The distillery produces Ettaler Kloster Liqueur, a herbal liqueur which, like that of the Carthusian monks, comes in sweeter yellow and more herbal green varieties.

== School ==
In the tradition of the Ritterakademie, the abbey established a secondary school ("Gymnasium") specialising in the humanities and modern languages, with a boarding house. The boarding school and its clergy were charged with sexual and physical child abuse and have been under investigation since 2 March 2010 by the German Federal Prosecutor. The abbot has since resigned.

Notable alumni include Karl Joseph von Firmian, Duarte Nuno, Duke of Braganza, Franz, Duke of Bavaria and diplomat Rupprecht von Keller.

== Abbots ==
- Heinrich I. Rieter von Kornburg, 1331–44
- Eberhard aus Niederaltaich, 1344–49
- Jodok von Agenwang, 1349–53
- Konrad I. Kummersprugger aus Tegernsee, 1360–90
- Heinrich II. Zucker, 1390–93
- Berner/Werner, 1393–99 († 1407)
- Konrad II. Duringfeld, 1399–1413
- Heinrich III. Sandauer, 1413–14
- Ulrich Hohenkircher, 1414–19
- Konrad III. Schifflein/Schifflin, 1419–39
- Johannes I. Kufsteiner, 1440–52 († 1455)
- Simon Hueber, 1452–76
- Stephan Precht, 1476–92
- Benedikt Zwink, 1492–95 († 1495)
- Johannes II. Spangler, 1495–1511
- Maurus I. Wagner, 1511–22
- Maurus II. Nuzinger, 1522–49
- Placidus I. Gall, 1549–66
- Nikolaus Streitl, 1566–90
- Leonhard Hilpolt, 1590–1615
- Othmar I. Goppelsrieder, 1615–37
- Ignatius Rueff, 1637–58
- Virgil Hegler, 1658–68
- Benedikt II. Eckart, 1668–75
- Roman Schretter, 1675–97
- Romuald Haimblinger, 1697–1708
- Placidus II. Seitz, 1709–36
- Bernhard I. Oberhauser, 1736–39
- Benedikt III. Pacher, 1739–59 († 1796)
- Bernhard II. (Ludwig) von Eschenbach, 1761–79 (son of Maximillian II. Emanuel)
- Othmar II. Seywold, 1779–87
- Alphons Hafner, 1787–1802 († 7 May 1807)
- Secularization, 1802–1906
- Willibald Wolfsteiner, 1907–33
- Angelus Kupfer, 1933–51
- Johannes Maria Hoeck, 1951–61
- Karl Gross, 1961–73
- Edelbert Hörhammer, 1973–2005
- Barnabas Bögle, 2005–10
  - Emmeram Walter, February–July 2010, Administrator
- Barnabas Bögle, since 11 July 2010

== Gallery ==
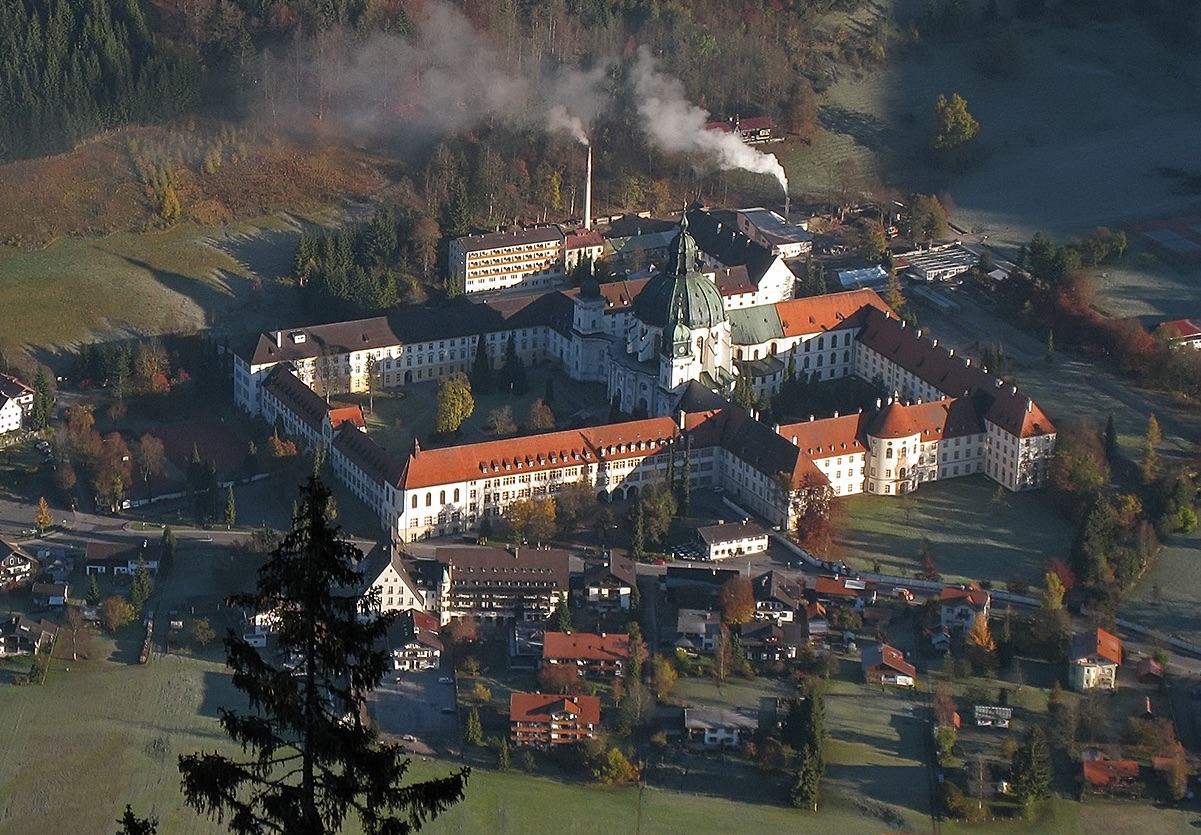
Aerial view

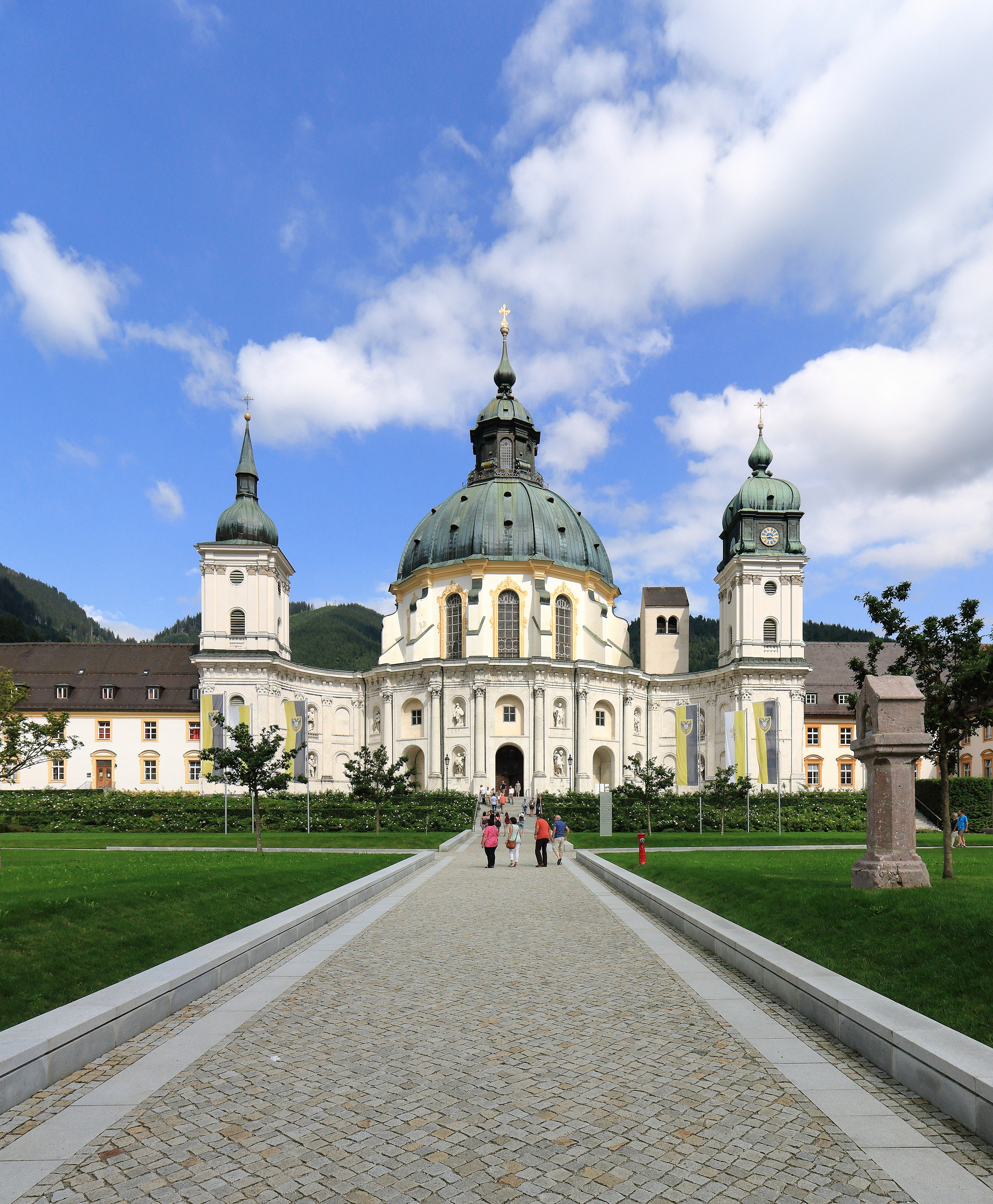
Exterior

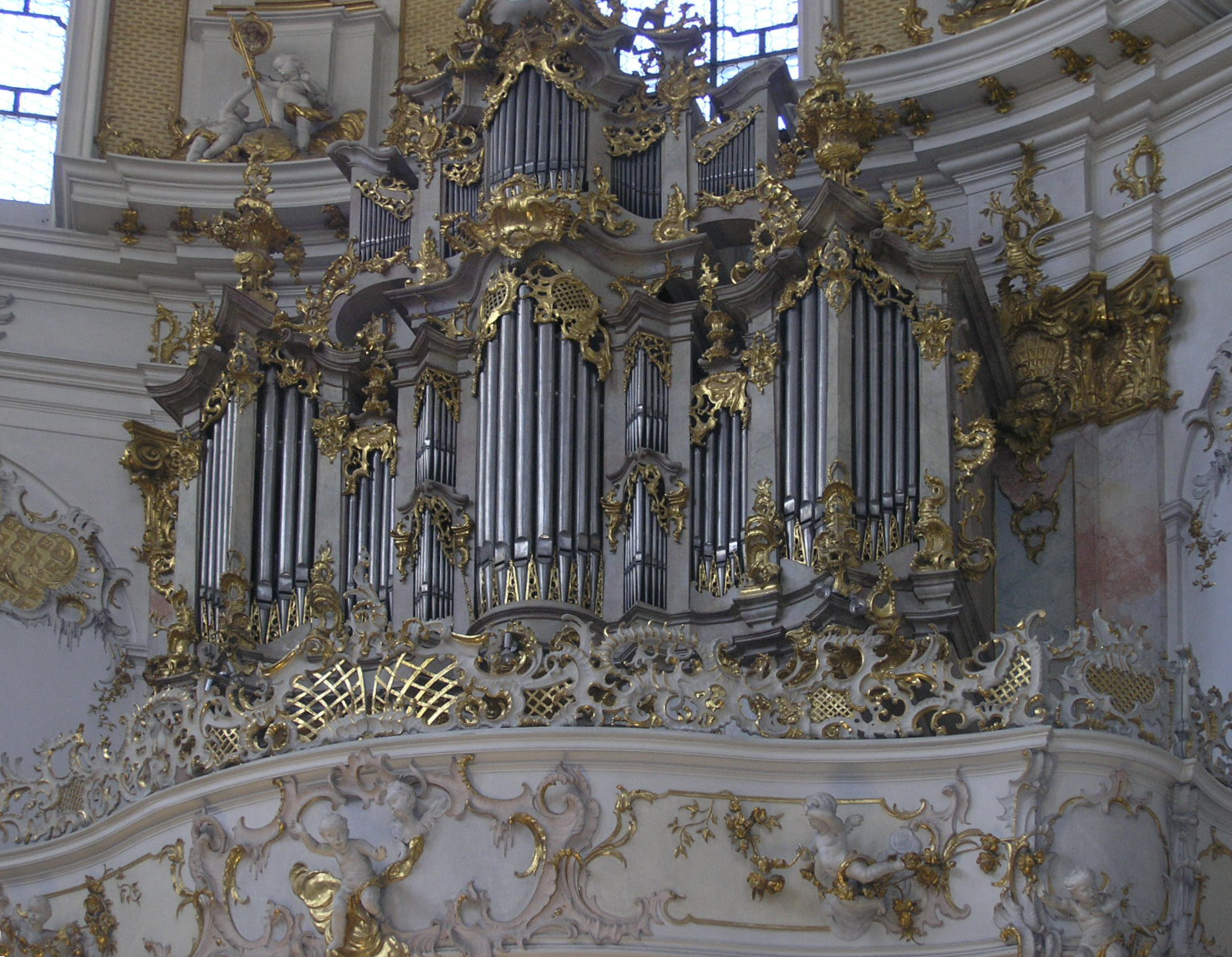
Organ

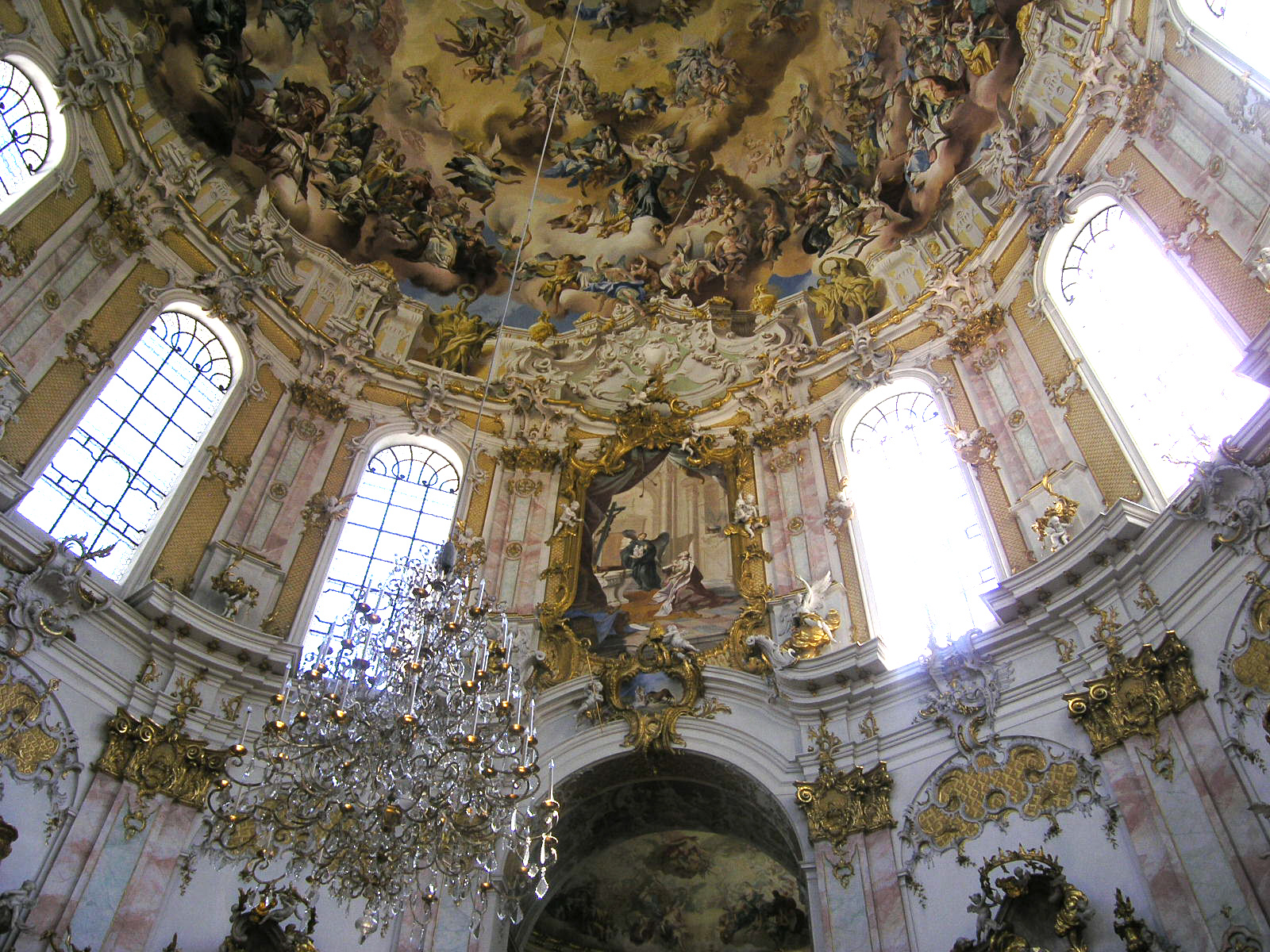
Interior

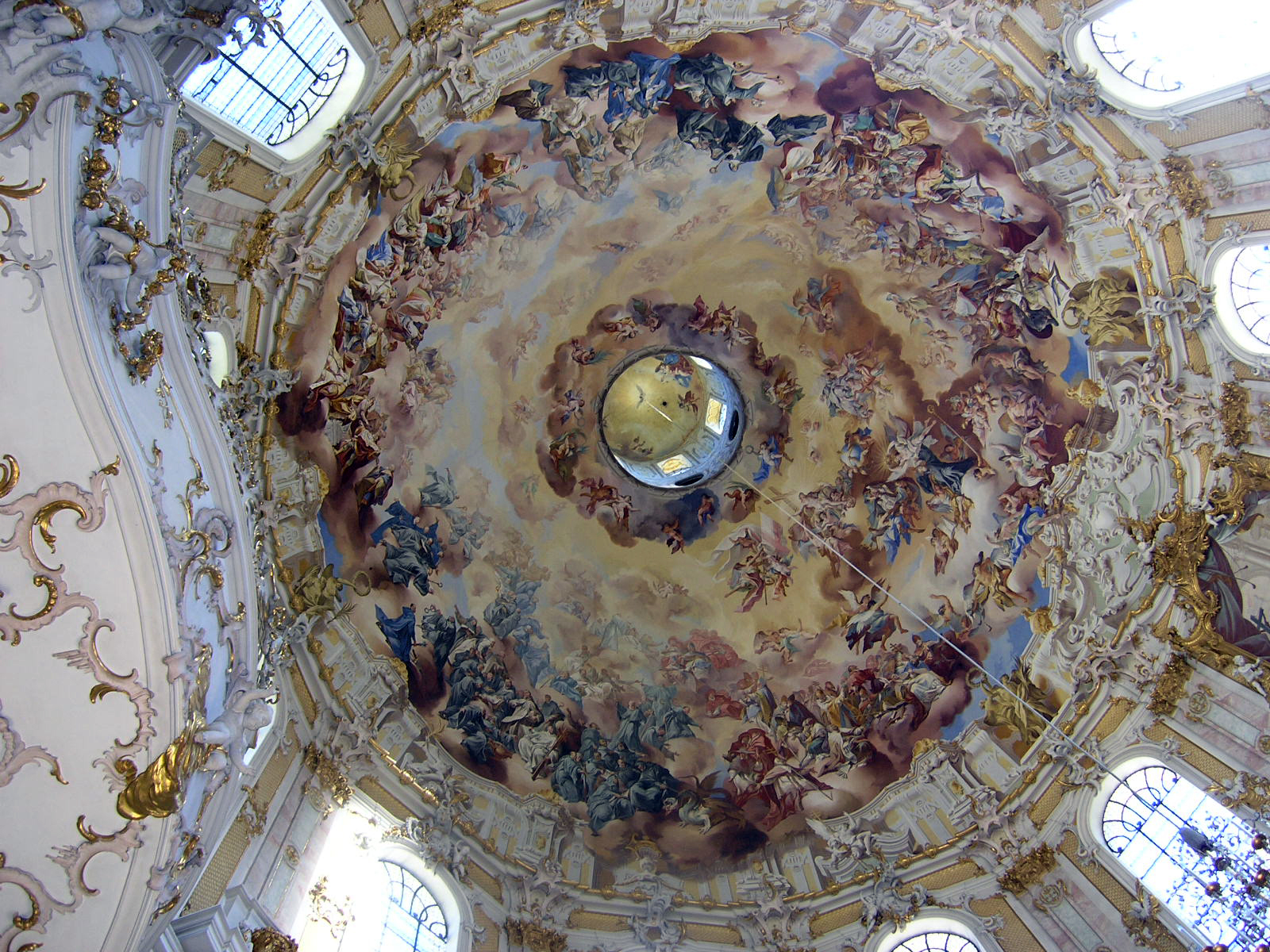
Dome

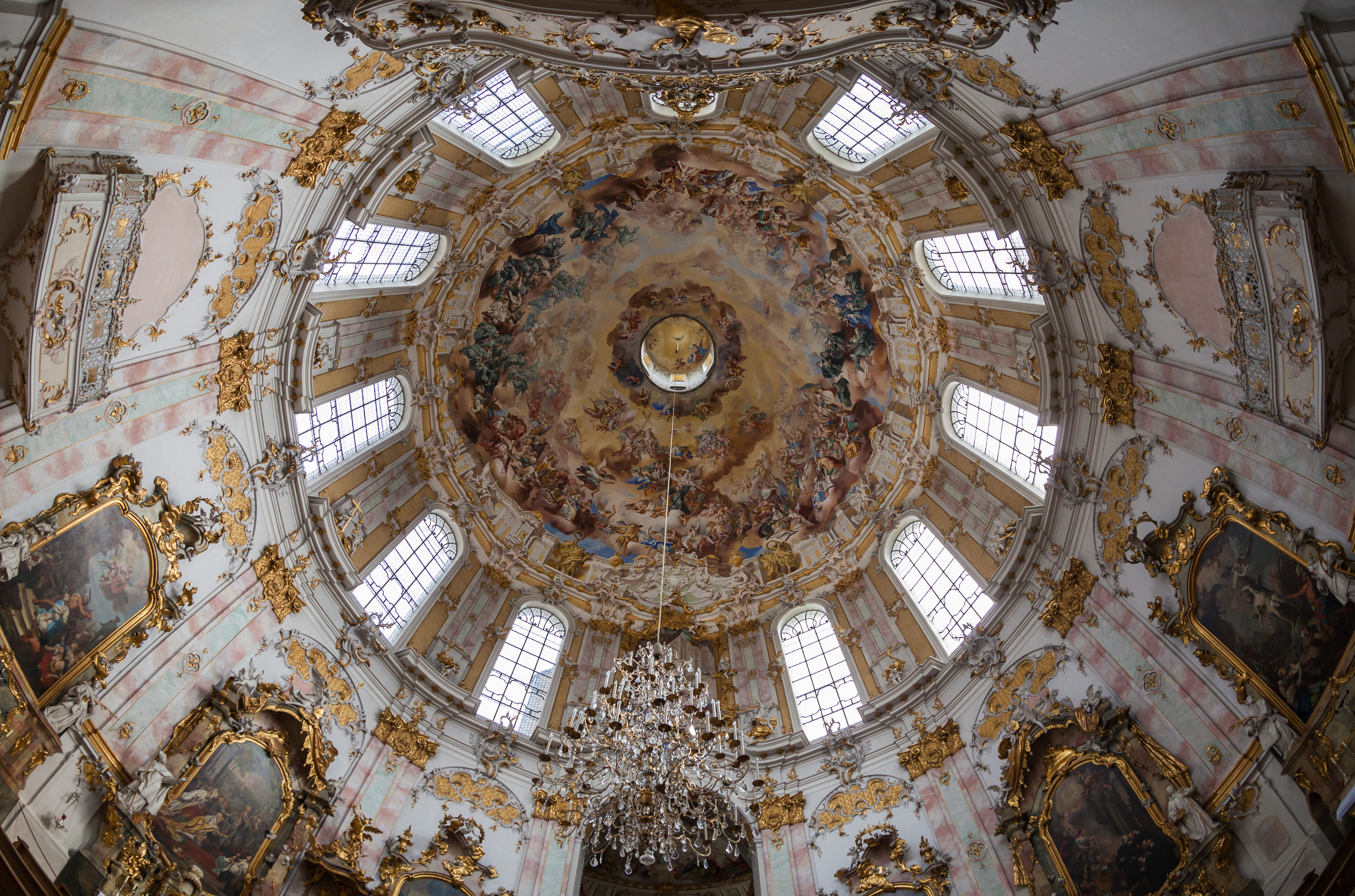
Dome

== See also ==
- Roman Catholic Marian churches

== Sources ==
- Drößler, Adolf (1930). Königsschloß Linderhof, Oberammergau und Kloster Ettal. Würzburg: Violette Bücher.
- Koch, Laurentius (1996). Basilika Ettal. Kloster-, Pfarr- und Wallfahrtskirche. Ettal: Buch-Kunstverlag.
- Prosch, Magdalena (1927). Die sonnige Not. Regensburg: Manz.
- Sarach, Rupert (1970). Festschrift zum 300jährigen Weihejubiläum der Klosterkirche Ettal. Ettal: Buch-Kunstverlag.
- Schenk, Clemens (1960). Kloster Ettal bei Oberammergau. Eine kunstgeschichtliche Betrachtung. Würzburg: Triltsch.
- Schnell, Hugo (1960). Ettal. Kloster- und Marien-Münster. Munich: Schnell & Steiner.
- Seidel, Max (1860). Kloster Ettal. Kurzgefaßte Nachricht von dem Ursprunge, Fortgange und Ende des Benediktinerklosters Ettal. Munich: Weiß.
- Seidel, Max (1949). Ad gloriam dei. Neue Bilder vom Benediktinerkloster Ettal. Stuttgart: Belser.
