= Ruffini =

Ruffini is an Italian surname. Notable people with the surname include:

- Angelo Ruffini (1864–1929), Italian histologist and embryologist
- Attilio Ruffini (1924–2011), Italian politician
- Ernesto Ruffini (1888–1967), Archbishop of Palermo
- Frederick Ernst Ruffini (1851-1885), American architect
- Giovanni Ruffini (1807–1881), Italian poet and librettist
- Giulano Ruffini (born 1945), French art collector
- Giuseppe or Joseph Ruffini (1690–1749), Italian-Austrian painter
- Luca Ruffini (born 1997), Italian footballer
- Oscar Ruffini (1858-1957), American architect
- Paolo Ruffini (mathematician) (1765–1822), Italian mathematician and philosopher
- Paolo Ruffini (actor) (born 1978), Italian actor and presenter
- Patrick Ruffini, political pollster and strategist
- Sandro Ruffini (1889–1954), Italian actor and voice actor
- Remo Ruffini (born 1942), Italian astrophysicist
- Remo Ruffini (businessman) (born 1961), Italian billionaire businessman
- Silvia Ruffini (1475–1561), Italian noble woman and mistress of Cardinal Alessandro Farnese
- Simone Ruffini (born 1989), Italian swimmer
- Stefano Ruffini (1963–2006), Italian singer and voice actor

== See also ==
- Eugen Ruffínyi (1846–1924), Slovak mining engineer and amateur speleologist; the original family name was probably "Ruffini"
