= Rufin =

Rufin is a surname and a male given name. Notable people with this name include:

== Given name ==
- Rufin Anthony (1940–2016), Pakistani Roman Catholic bishop
- Rufin Molomadan (born 1967), Central African Republic cyclist
- Rufin Oba (born 1976), Congolese football player
- Rufin Sudkovsky (1850–1885), Russian Imperial landscape painter

== Surname ==
- Guillaume Rufin (born 1990), French tennis player
- Jean-Christophe Rufin (born 1952), French doctor, diplomat, historian, globetrotter and novelist
- Zomahoun Idossou Rufin (born 1964), Beninese diplomat in Japan

== See also ==
- Ruffin (name)
