= Ruffin (name) =

Ruffin is a name.

== Family name ==
- Amber Ruffin, comedian and writer
- Bruce Ruffin, American baseball pitcher
- Bruce Ruffin, reggae singer
- Chance Ruffin, American baseball pitcher
- David Ruffin (1941–1991), American singer, one of the lead singers with The Temptations
- Edmund Ruffin (1794–1865), American agricultural writer and Confederate firebrand
- François Amable Ruffin, French general
- François Ruffin, French journalist, activist, and politician
- George Lewis Ruffin, first African-American graduate of Harvard University
- Jimmy Ruffin (1936–2014), American singer
- Joe Ruffin, victim in the Jenkins County, Georgia, riot of 1919
- Josephine Ruffin, American civil rights leader
- Michael Ruffin, American basketball player
- Oxblood Ruffin, Canadian hacker, member of Cult of the Dead Cow and Hacktivismo
- Phil Ruffin, American businessman
- Saint Ruffin, legendary Anglo-Saxon saint
- Thomas Ruffin (1787–1870), American jurist, Chief Justice of North Carolina Supreme Court

== Given name ==
- Harrison Ruffin Tyler (born 1928), American chemical engineer, businessperson, and preservationist
- Ruffin McNeill (born 1958), American football coach and player

== See also ==
- Rufin
