= Enrico Zuccalli =

Italian architect

Enrico Zuccalli (Johann Heinrich Zuccalli; c. 1642 – 8 March 1724) was a Swiss architect who worked for the Wittelsbach regents of Bavaria and Cologne.

== Biography ==
Zuccalli was born in Roveredo, then part of the Republic of the Three Leagues (today Canton Grisons, Switzerland). From 1669 he lived in Munich and became a major representative of the introduction of Italian Baroque architecture to Germany. He was a bitter rival of another Swiss architect, Giovanni Antonio Viscardi. In 1672 Zuccalli became chief architect of the Bavarian court as successor of Agostino Barelli and remained in office until the Austrian invasion of Bavaria in 1706. He died in Munich.

He was the uncle of (Giovanni) Gaspare Zuccalli who built two churches at Salzburg.

== Chief works ==
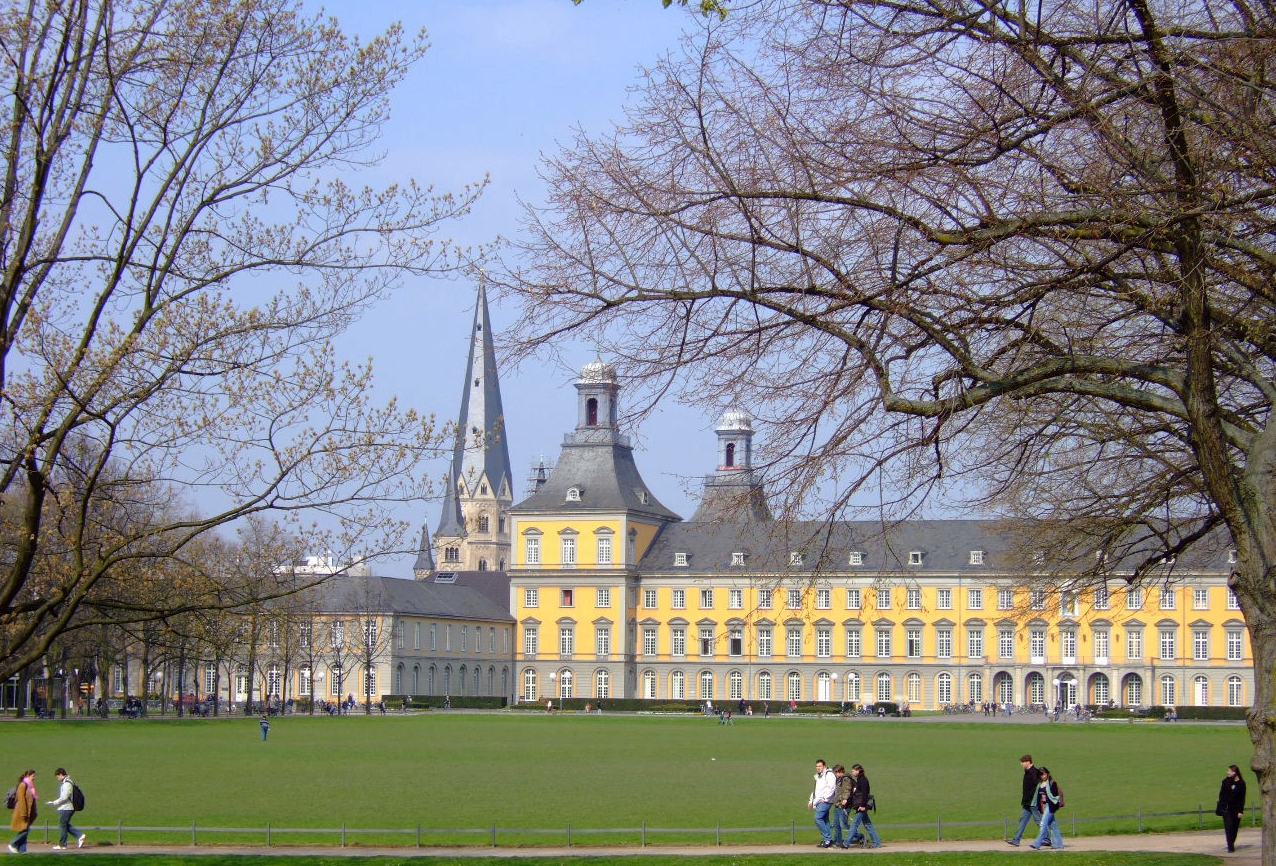
Electoral Palace of Bonn

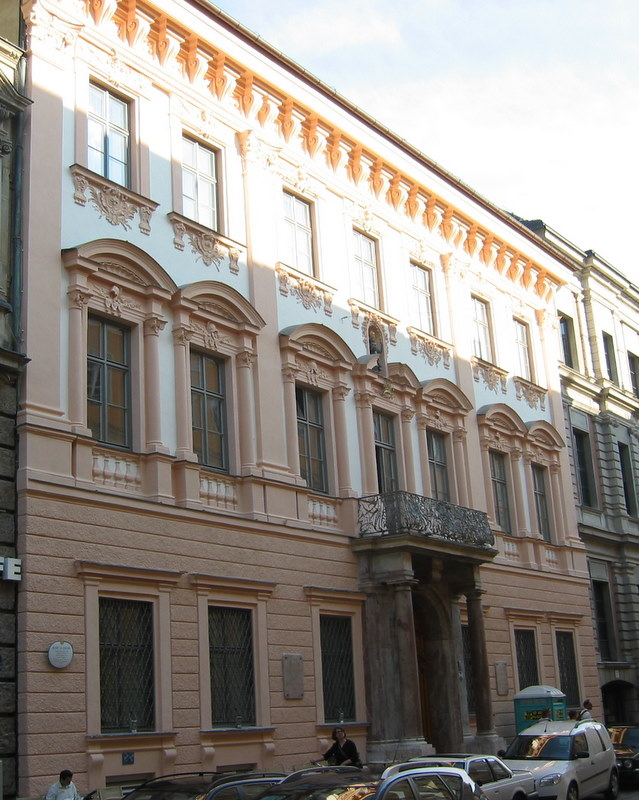
Palais Porcia

- Theatinerkirche (Munich) since 1674 (completing the work of Barelli)
- Residenz, Munich (1680–1701)
- Lustheim Palace (1684–1689)
- Palais Porcia in Munich (1694)
- Electoral Palace of Bonn (1697–1702) (later completed by de Cotte)
- Schleissheim Palace (1701–1704) (later completed by Effner)
- Re-built Ettal Abbey (1709–26)
