= Ruffian =

A ruffian is a scoundrel, rascal or unprincipled, deceitful, and unreliable person.

Ruffian may refer to:

== People and groups ==
- Ruffian (horse) (1972–1975), a famous thoroughbred racehorse
- Border Ruffians, pro-Slavery activists from Missouri in the American Civil War
- The Ruffians, the major antagonists of the Nintendo game Sin and Punishment
- Ruffians, the fans of FuwaMoco

== Media ==
- Ruffian (film), a 2007 television movie about the racehorse
- The Ruffian, a 1983 French-Canadian criminal adventure film
- The Ruffian on the Stair, a 1964 British play

== Ships ==
- Ruffian 23, Irish sailboat designed by Billy Brown
- HMS Bellerophon (1786), also known as Billy Ruffian

== Other uses ==
- Ruffian Games, a Scottish games developer
- Ruffian, a chess engine
- British codename of the German X-Geraet, radar system
