= Joseph Ruffini =

Italian painter

Joseph or Giuseppe Ruffini (1690 - February 7, 1749) was painter from the Holy Roman Empire.

== Biography ==
He was born in Merano in the Tyrol. He trained with his father, and by 1711 he had moved to work in Munich in Bavaria. He is best known for his late-Baroque cycle of paintings for the Ottobeuren Abbey. He died in Bavaria.
