= Johann Baptist Straub =

German sculptor (1704–1784)

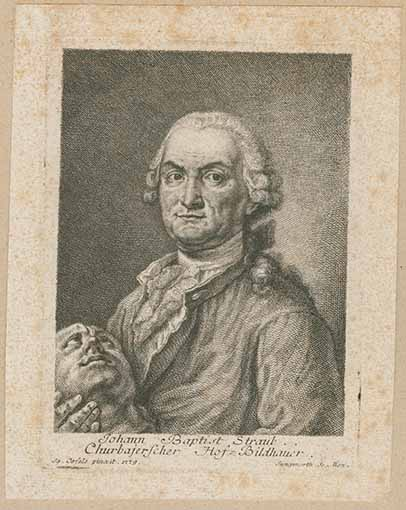
The Sculpteur Johann Baptist Straub, engraving by Franz Xaver Jungwirth, 1779

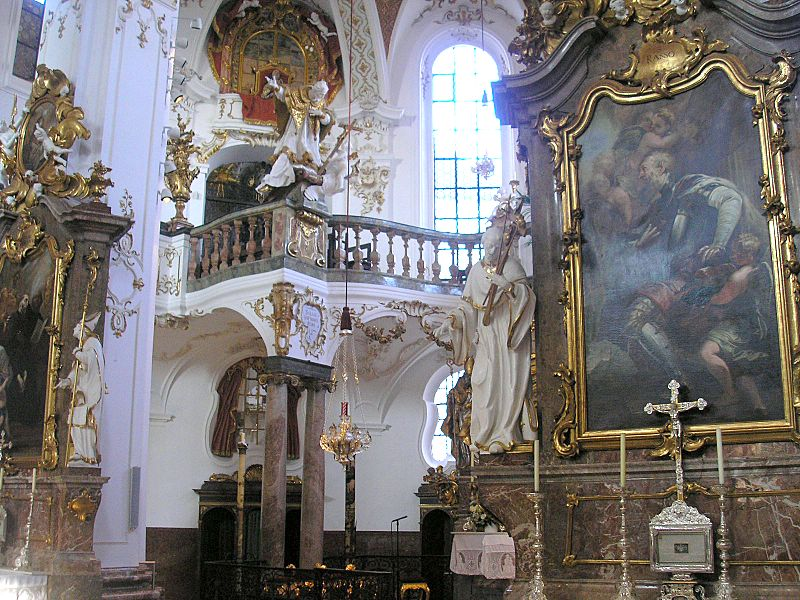
View into the choir, showing altars and figures by Straub, Andechs Abbey.

Johann Baptist Straub (baptized 1 June 1704 – 15 July 1784) was a German Rococo sculptor.

== Biography ==
Straub was born in Wiesensteig, into a family of sculptors. His father Johann George Straub and his brothers Philipp Jakob, Joseph, and Johann Georg Straub were also sculptors, as was his nephew Franz Xaver Messerschmidt. J. B. Straub studied in Munich with the court sculptor Gabriel Luidl and then went to Vienna, where he worked from 1726 to 1734.

In 1734 Straub returned to Munich. In 1737 he was appointed by Elector Karl Albrecht from Bavaria as the court sculptor. In the same year Straub married a daughter of the court engraver, Franz Xaver Späth.

Straub worked primarily in Upper Bavarian churches and monasteries, frequently alongside some of the greatest Baroque artists of the day: the architect Johann Michael Fischer, the painter Johann Baptist Zimmermann, the Asam Brothers, the Tyrolian painter Johann Jacob Zeiller, and the stuccoists Franz Xaver and Johann Michael Feuchtmayer, among others. Usually Straub's figures are carved in simple white, with very little gold trim.

Important works by Straub are in the Residenz in Munich as well as in Schloss Nymphenburg. His best-known church works are the altars of the monastic churches of Andechs and Schäftlarn as well as St. Michael's Church in Berg am Laim, a borough of Munich.

Straub died in Munich, where his workshop was the most important of its day. The most famous artist to study there was Ignaz Günther.

== Major works ==
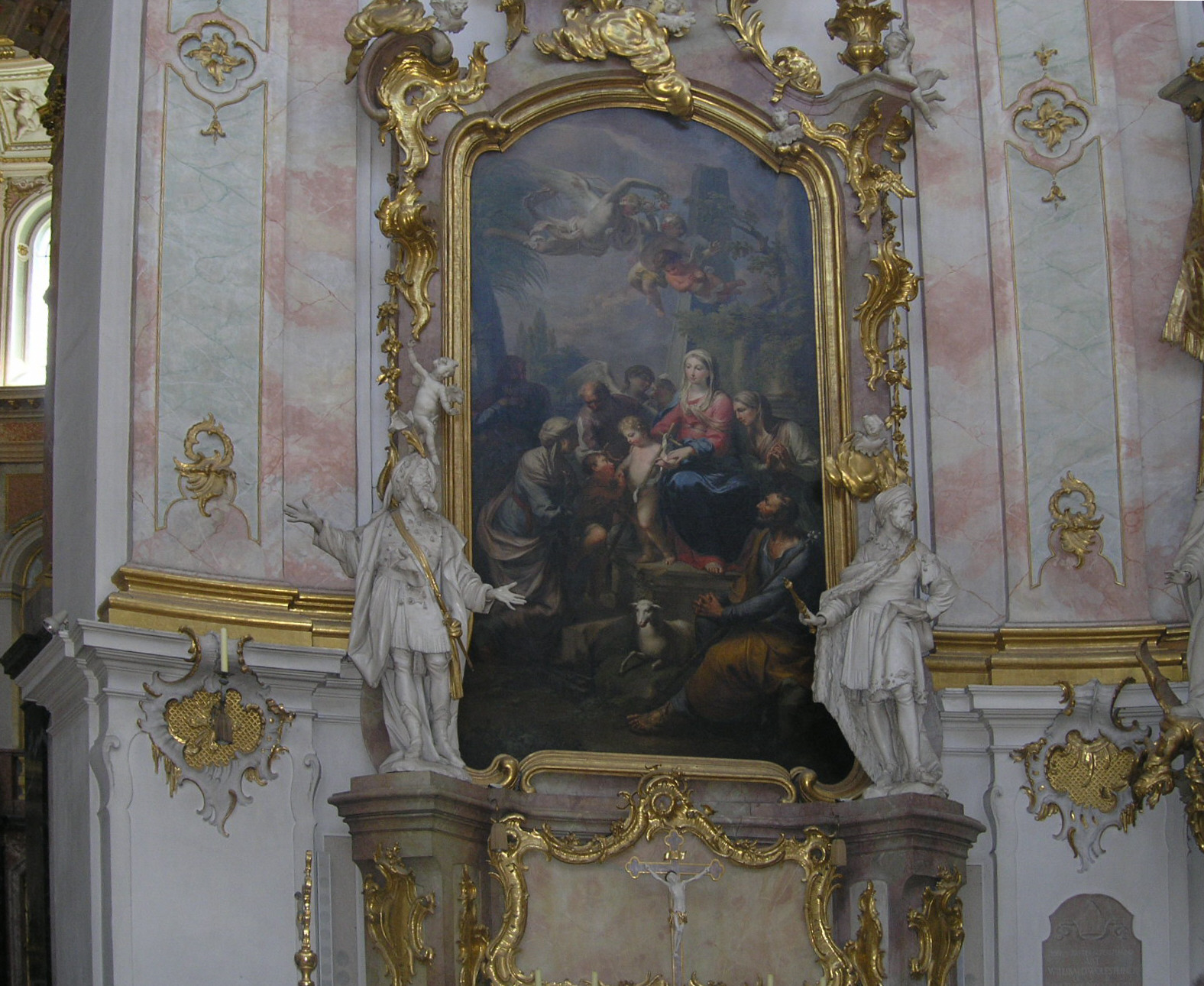
One of the side altars at Ettal Abbey

=== Austria ===
- Laxenburg—Schwarzspanierkirche Wien (pulpit) (1730)

=== Bavaria ===
- Altomünster—Brigittine Monastery Church (altars in the lay nave, figures of apostles, upper high altar, altars in the choir) (1765–1769)
- Andechs—Pilgrimage Church of the Annunciation (altars, figures of St. Elisabeth von Thüringen and St. Nicholas) (1750)
- Bichl—Parish Church of St. George (high altar) (1752)
- Dießen am Ammersee—Church of St. Maria (side altars and pulpit) (1739–1741)
- Ettal—Benedictine Monastery Church (pulpit and side altars) (1757–1765)
- Fürstenzell—Cistercian Monastery Church of the Ascension of the Blessed Virgin (altar and tabernacle) (1741)
- Munich—Franciscan Monastery Church of St. Anna im Lehel (high altar tabernacle and pulpit) (1738–1739)
- Munich—Dreifaltigkeitskirche (tabernacle relief) (1760)
- Munich—Parish Church of St. Michael (high altar and side altars) (1743)
- Munich—St. George in Bogenhausen (high altar) (1770–1773)
- Oberaudorf—Kloster Reisach (side altars) (1748–1757)
- Polling—Kloster Polling (high altar renovation) (1763)
- Schäftlarn—Premonstratensian Monastery (pulpits and altars) (1755–1764)
- Steingaden—Premonstratensian Monastery Church of St. John the Baptist (figures of founders on the pillars of the high altar) (1740)
