= John Parker (painter) =

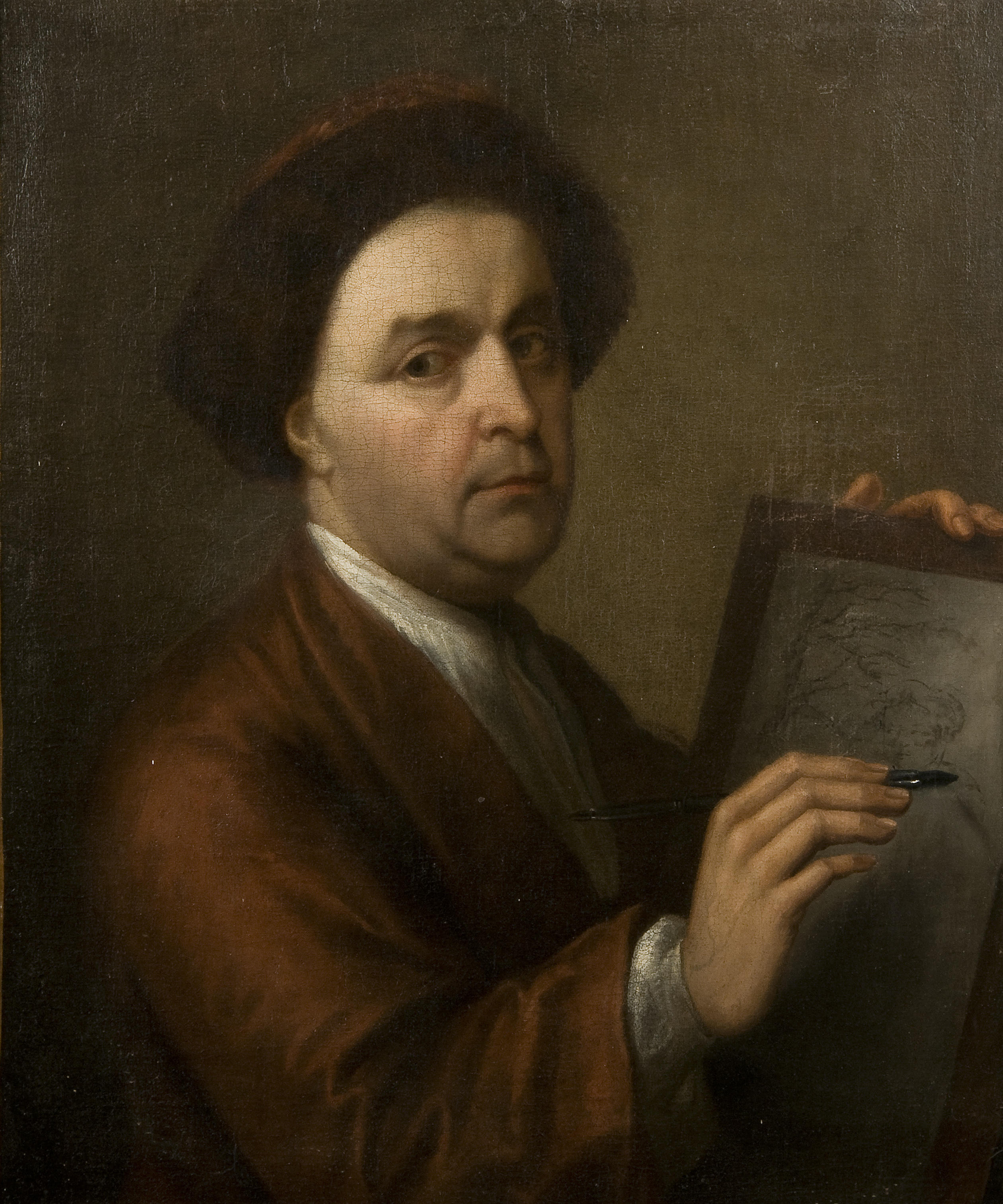
Self-portrait (1763)

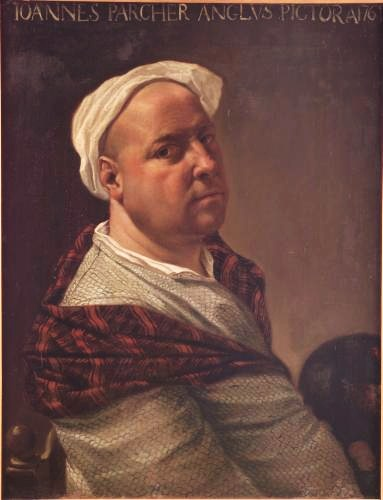
Portrait of Parker by Marco Benefial (1761)

John Parker (1710, London - 1765, London) was an English history and portrait painter, who spent much of his career in Italy.

== Biography ==
He went to Rome on a study visit in 1745, and remained there for several years; becoming a student of Marco Benefial in 1748. The following year, he painted an altarpiece for the Basilica of San Gregorio Magno al Celio, on the Caelian Hill. In 1751, he witnessed an eruption of Vesuvius.

From 1752, he was also Director of an art school founded under the leadership of James Caulfeild, 1st Earl of Charlemont, a patron of the arts from Ireland. Known as the Academy of English Professors of the Liberal Arts, it was in operation for only six years, when major disagreements among its members forced the Earl to order it closed. During its brief existence, it also provided copies of the Italian Old Masters for the English art market, and Parker worked as an agent.

Later, he went to the Accademia delle Arti del Disegno in Florence then to the Accademia di San Luca. His best known student was the German artist, Franz Ignaz Oefele, who became a court painter in Munich.

In 1762, he returned to England and, the following year, participated in an exhibition at the Free Society of Artists, where he presented a self-portrait and an historical scene, depicting the assassination of David Rizzio. He also exhibited at the Royal Academy of Arts.
