= Franz Ignaz Oefele =

German painter (1721–1797)

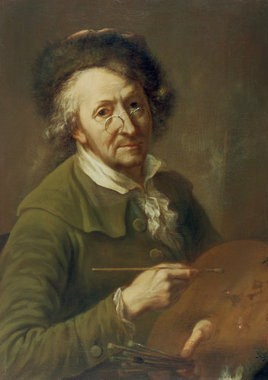
Self-portrait (1791)

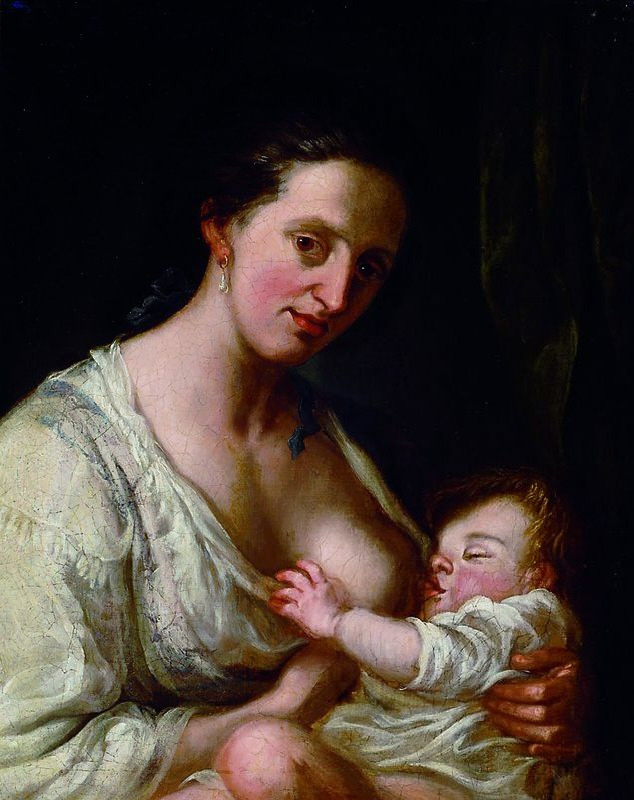
Nursing Mother (1789)

Franz Ignaz Oefele (26 June 1721, Posen - 18 September 1797, Munich) was a German painter, etcher, and miniaturist. His name is sometimes spelled "Öffele" and is occasionally seen as "Oeffele-Piekarski", for reasons unknown.

== Life ==
His father was a watchmaker from Bavaria, who died before Oefele was a year old, so he was raised by an uncle in Landsberg am Lech who operated a brewery. There, apparently having displayed some artistic inclinations, he took lessons from a local painter, then went on to Ingolstadt, where he studied with Melchior Buchner and, finally, to Augsburg for lessons with Gottfried Bernhard Göz. He then went to work for Balthasar Augustin Albrecht, the Bavarian court painter. in Munich. After some time there, working with several artists, he went to Venice and was accepted as a student by Giuseppe Nogari.

He remained there for six years, followed by studies with the English history painter John Parker and the Flemish painter Jan Frans van Bloemen in Rome. After eight years in Italy, he returned to Munich and became the court painter for Maximilian III Joseph, Elector of Bavaria. In 1770, he helped to create and was appointed the first Professor of Drawing at what would later become the Academy of Fine Arts, with an annual salary of 100 Gulden. He was also a member of the Kunstakademie Düsseldorf.

He painted primarily altarpieces and portraits. Several of his best-known portraits were made into copper engravings by Franz Xaver Jungwirth. Despite his apparent success, it is reported that he left his family in serious financial difficulties.

His older cousin was the historian and librarian, Andreas Felix von Oefele.
