= Academy of English Professors of the Liberal Arts =

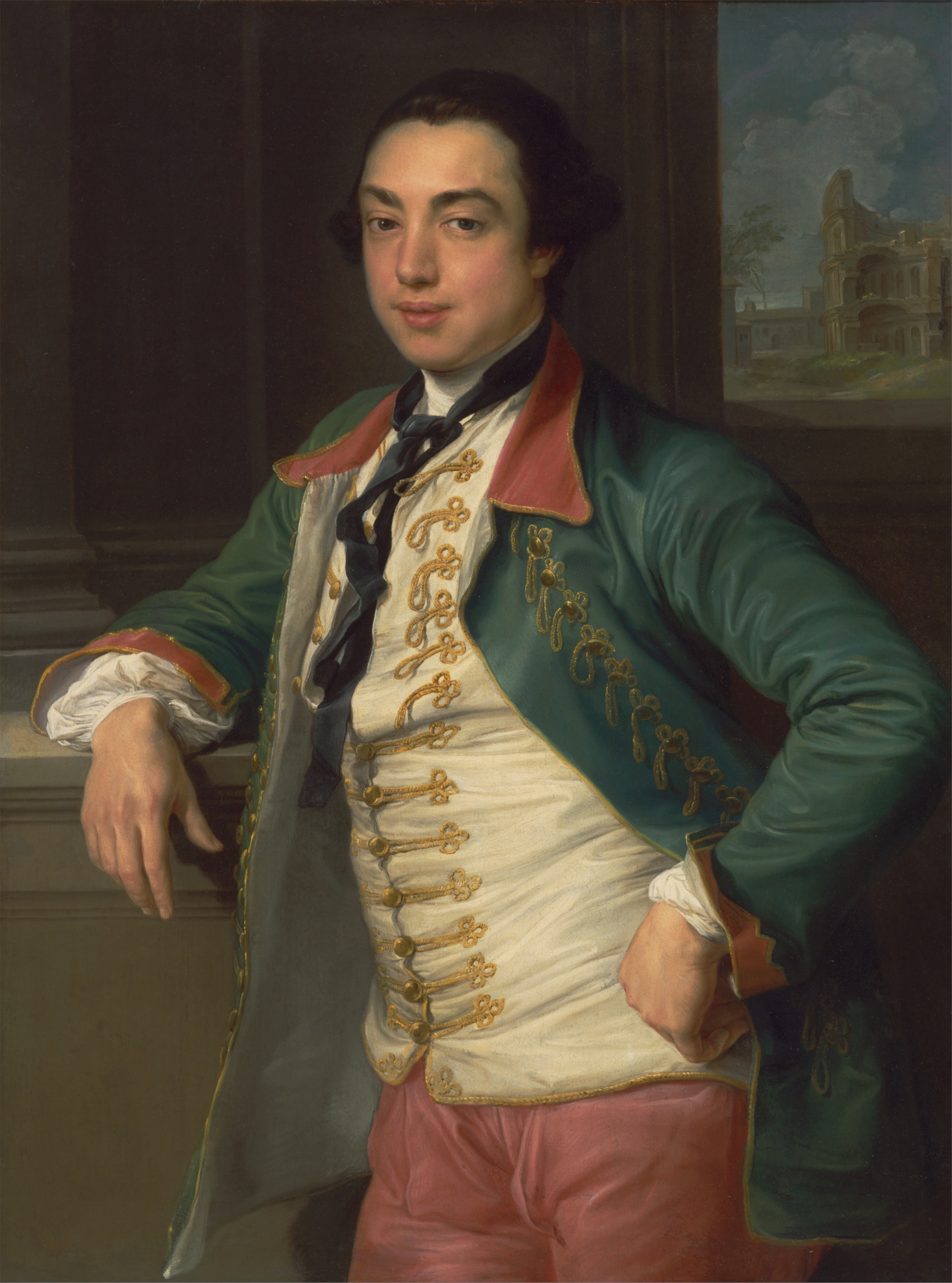
James Caulfeild, 1st Earl of Charlemont, Founder of the Academy Painter: Pompeo Batoni, around 1755 (1753–1756), oil on canvas, 97.8 × 73.7 cm

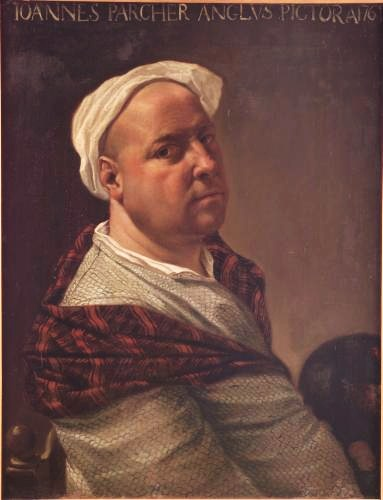
John Parker, Director of the Academy Painter: Marco Benefial, 1761

The Academy of English Professors of the Liberal Arts was a British art school in Rome.

== History ==
Some English artists and art lovers founded the English Art Academy in Rome for British and Irish artists on May 11, 1752, under the leadership of the art-loving Irish nobleman James Caulfeild (1728–1799) – modeled after the already existing French Académie de France à Rome. The new art school emerged from the earlier Academy of History Painters founded in 1748 by 16 English painters in Rome. At that time, the Italian capital had developed into a center of international art education.

The sole director of this art academy as well as its predecessor was the English historical and portrait painter John Parker, who had been in Rome for study purposes since 1745. Members of the academy included the architect William Chambers, the painters Gavin Hamilton, Thomas Patch, and Richard Wilson as well as the artist, collector, antiquities dealer, and banker Thomas Jenkins. The academy also functioned as a copying workshop for ancient Roman paintings for the English art market, with Parker working as an art agent for his sponsor Charlemont, who probably refinanced his expenses in Rome through the sale of the paintings.

However, the academy was closed down on Charlemont's orders after only six years in April 1758 due to disagreements among the artists working there. Causes also included the dispute that began in 1756 between Giovanni Battista Piranesi, Parker, and Charlemont, as well as earlier "misconduct" by the homosexual painter Thomas Patch, which led to his expulsion from Rome in 1755. Academy director John Parker also left Rome and was already at the Accademia di San Luca in 1756.
