= St. Michael in Berg am Laim, Munich =

Coordinates: 48°07′30″N 11°37′49″E

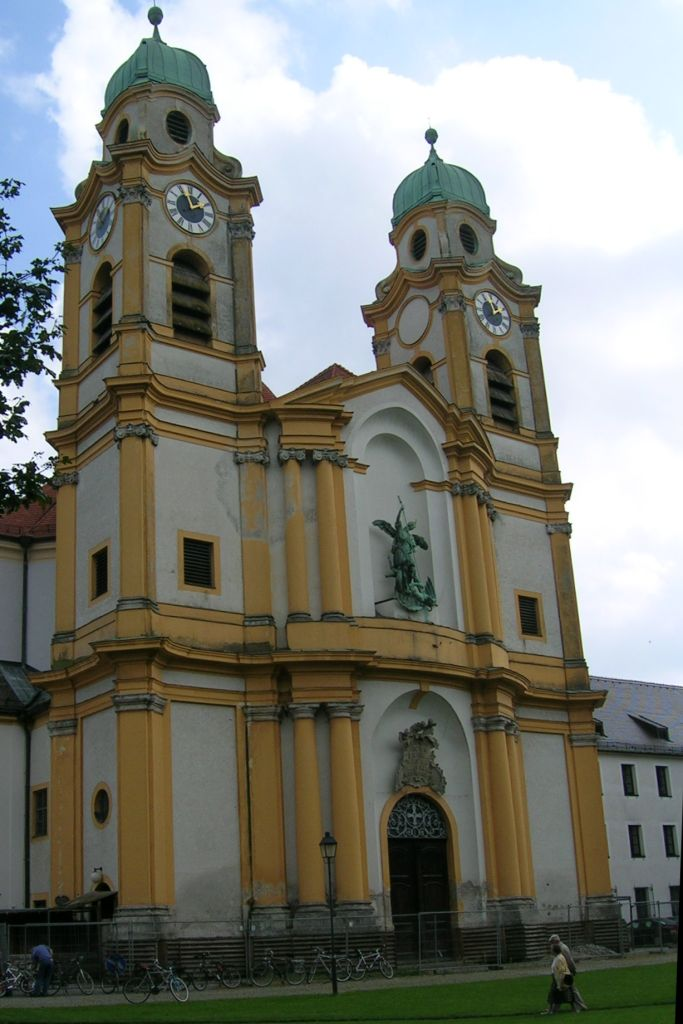
View of the church.

St Michael in Berg am Laim is a church in Munich, Bavaria, built from 1738 to 1751 by Johann Michael Fischer as Court Church for Elector and Archbishop Clemens August of Cologne, a brother of Emperor Charles.

Clemens August owned Berg am Laim as a manor. It was also served by the Military Order of Saint Michael until 1837 and by the Archbrotherhood of Saint Michaeluntil today. The Catholic church is one of the chief works of the Bavarian rococo period.

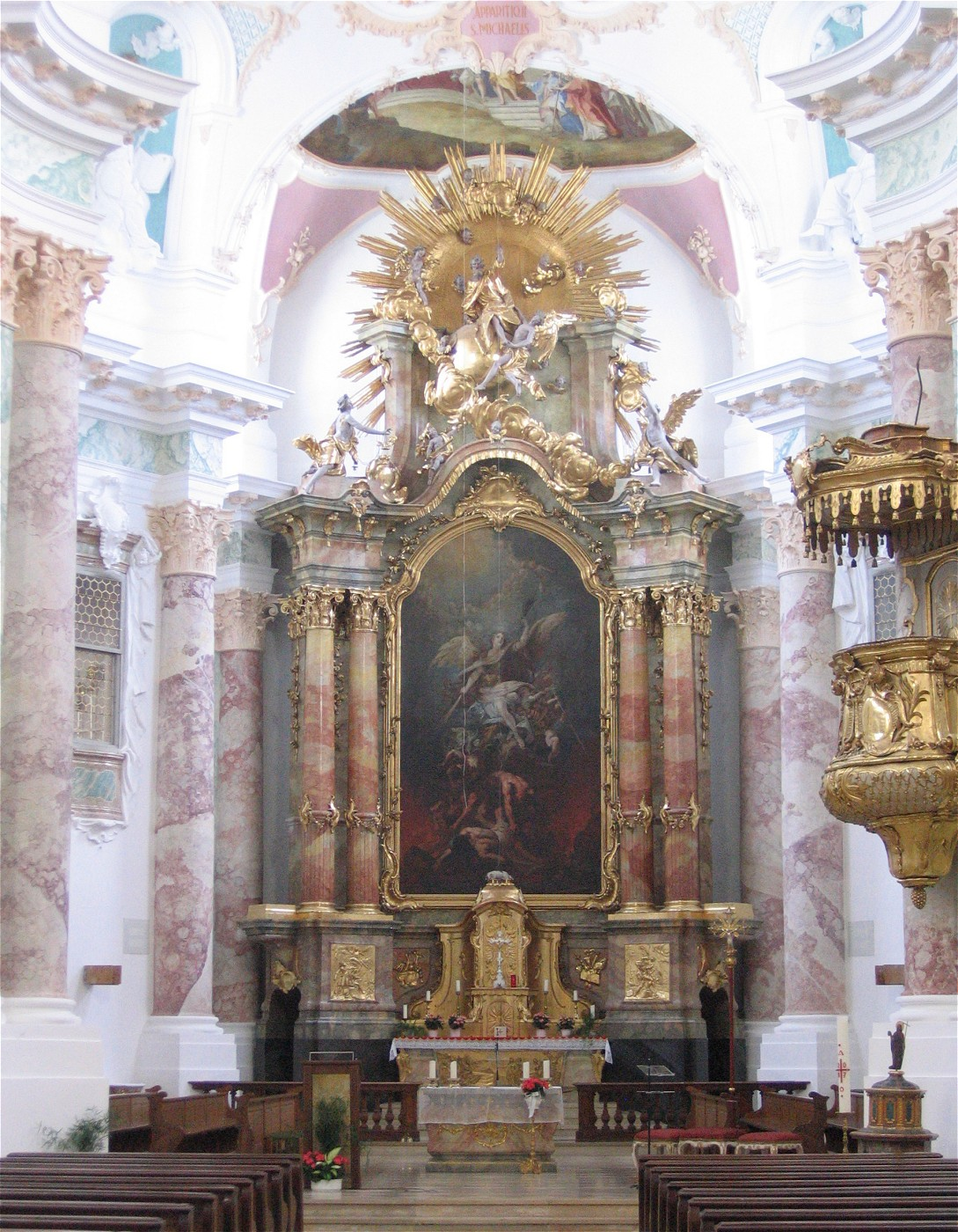
High altar.

== Architecture ==
The elegant façade with its twin towers provides a strong vertical accent was designed as the terminal feature of a street to the inner city which was never built. It is the only church of Fischer which was decorated in the rococo style with rich rocaille, maybe this was due to François de Cuvilliés the Elder, who served as a building inspector for this church.

Large round-headed arches divide the interior of the church in different sections. The central space is decorated by pilasters and columns and the corners are rounded off by several niches. The stucco and frescoes were created by Johann Baptist Zimmermann in 1743, the altars were constructed by Johann Baptist Straub.

The gilded figures on either side of the tabernacle are a contribution of Ignaz Günther. The painting of the high altar celebrating the archangel (by the Munich baroque painter Johann Andreas Wolff) and the statue of St. Roch (Andreas Faistenberger, 1690) were created already before the construction of the church. The altarpiece of the side altar St. Norbert was painted by Ignaz Joseph Schilling (1744/1746).

During World War II the church was heavily damaged on 30 April 1945 by artillery hit in the nave, but afterwards restored.

== See also ==
- Saint Michael in the Catholic Church
