= Philipp Jakob Straub =

Austrian sculptor (1706–1774)

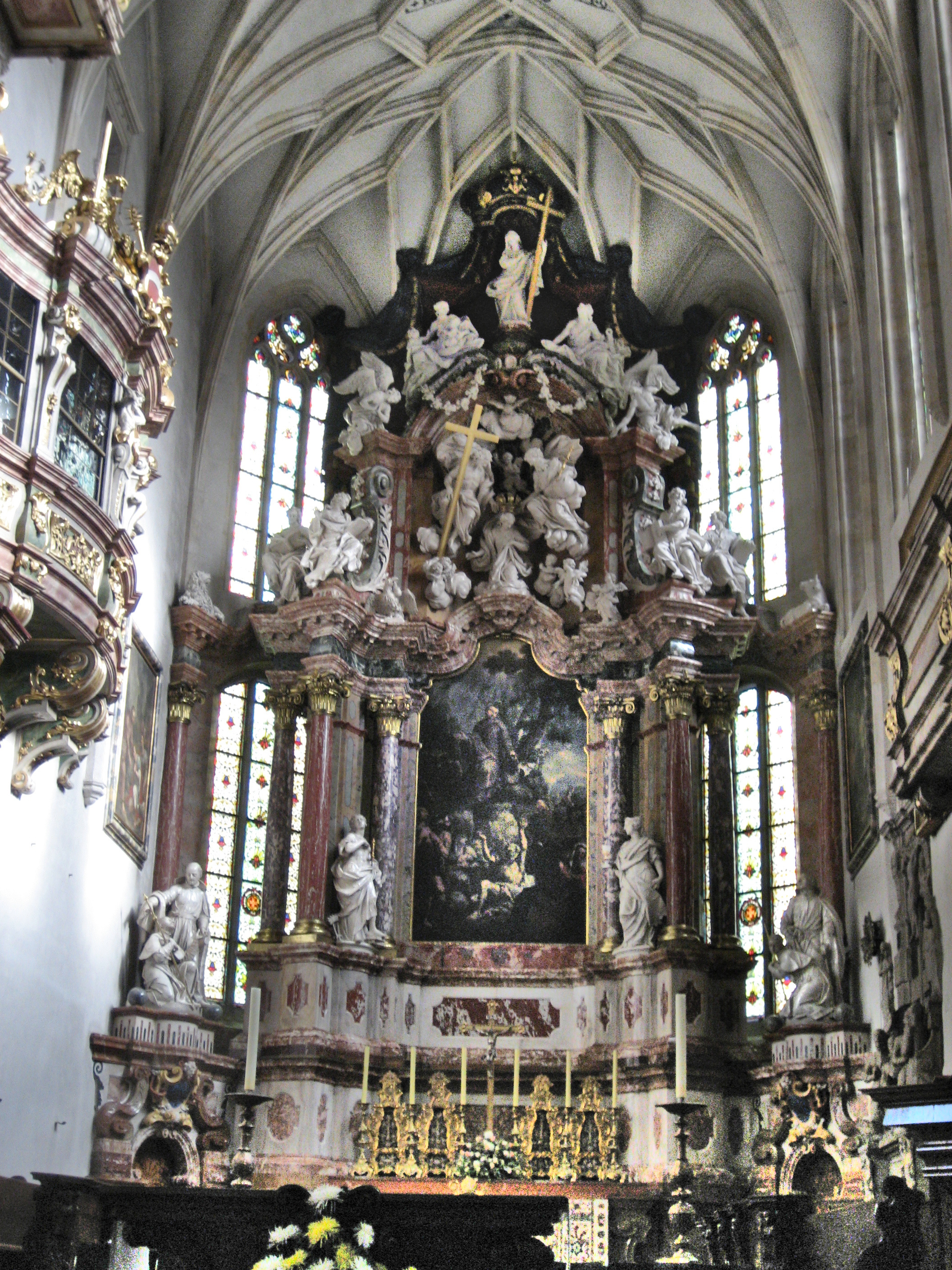
Figures by P. J. Straub on the altars in the Graz Cathedral

Philipp Jakob Straub (baptized 30 April 1706 – 26 August 1774) was an Austrian sculptor. He was from a well-known family of German Baroque sculptors. His father Johann George Straub and his brothers Johann Baptist, Joseph, and Johann Georg Straub were also sculptors, as was his nephew Franz Xaver Messerschmidt.

Straub was born in Wiesensteig in Germany and studied in Munich, but he spent most of his career in Austria, first in Vienna, where he studied at the Academy of Fine Arts, and then in Graz, where in 1730 he joined the workshop of the sculptor Johann Jakob Schoy (1686–1733).

In 1733, upon the death of Schoy, Straub married the widow of his mentor and took over his workshop. He remained in Graz for the rest of his life. He died there, aged 68.

Straub worked primarily in stone and wood in a Rococo style that was deeply influenced by local Styrian traditions.

His most notable works include the altars (1730) (now destroyed) in the Parish Church of the Holy Blood in Graz; the statue of St. John Nepomuk (1734) in front of the pilgrimage church in Weiz; the images of St. John Nepomuk and St. Aloysius (1744–1745) on the altars in the Cathedral of St. Ägydius in Graz; four statues (1764) in front of Schloss Eggenberg in Graz; the high altar and two side altars in the parish church at Ebersdorf (1766); and the figures of St. Michael and two other angels (1769) on the pediment of façade of the Maria-Hilf-Kirche in Graz.
