= Santa Maria dei Sette Dolori, Rome =

Santa Maria dei Sette Dolori
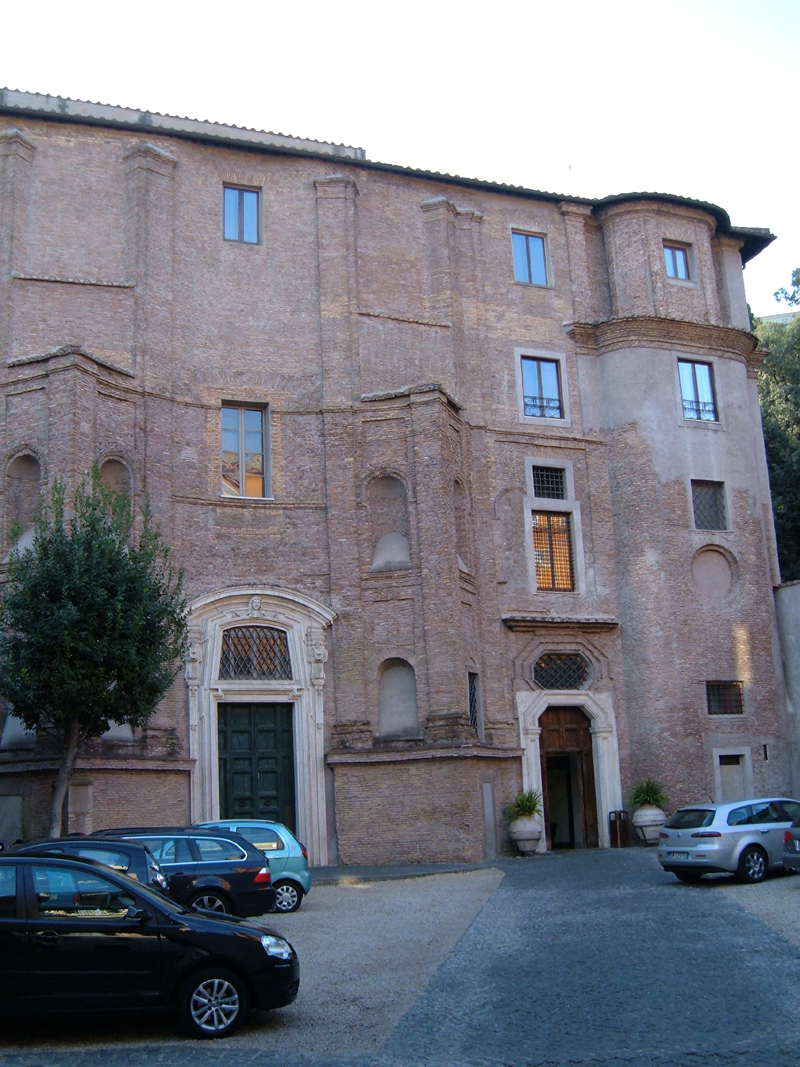
- Church and monastery facade
- Click on the map for a fullscreen view
- 41°53′24″N 12°27′59″E
- Location: Via dei Panieri, Rome
- Country: Italy
- Denomination: Roman Catholic

Architecture
- Architect: Francesco Borromini
- Architectural type: Church
- Groundbreaking: 1643

Santa Maria dei Sette Dolori is a Baroque church attached to a convent in the Rome rione of Trastevere, Italy. It stands on Via Garibaldi, near its junction with Via dei Panieri.

Construction of the church was begun in 1643, with plans by Francesco Borromini, annexed to an Augustinian nunnery founded by Camilla-Virginia Savelli Farnese, Duchess of Latera. When the fortunes of the House of Farnese declined, so did the funding for the church, and by 1655 the work was stopped. The convent underwent a number of tribulations during the nineteenth century; however, it was not deconsecrated in 1873, as were many other monasteries. Since then, the nunnery has slowly ebbed and most of the convent is now the Donna Camilla Savelli. The Diocese presently lists the church as being in the care of the few remaining nuns of the order of Suore Oblate del Santo Bambino Gesù. The monastery also served as a place to hide Jews from the fascist authorities active in the Holocaust during World War II.

The facade of the church remains in brick, deprived of decoration. It has concave front and some odd-shaped windows that underscore Borromini's Baroque idiosyncrasies. The interior still contains some of the marble sculptural decorations plus a St Augustine and the Mystery of the Trinity by Carlo Maratta and a canvas by Marco Benefial.
