= Franz Xaver Jungwirth =

German copperplate engraver (1720–1790)

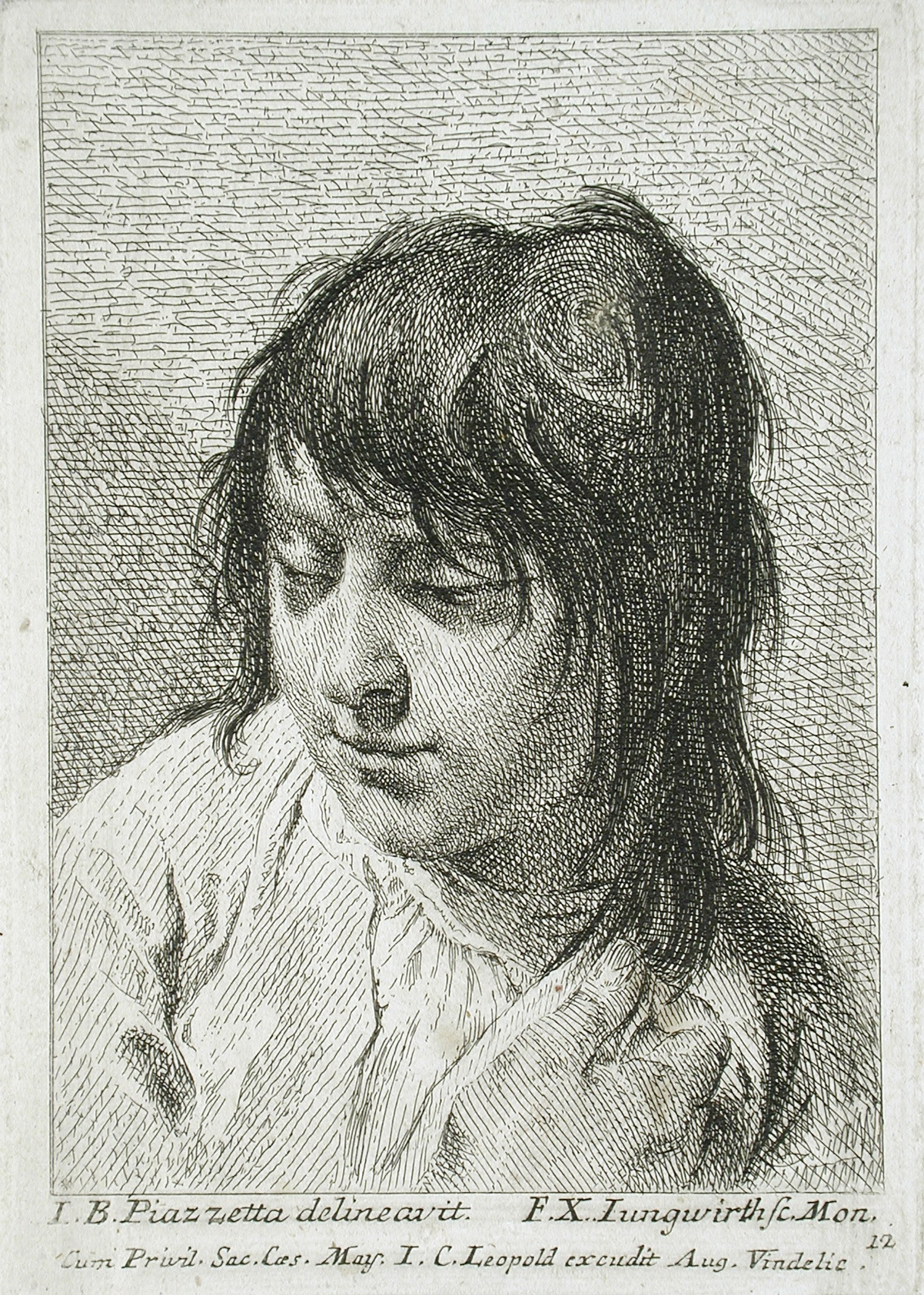
Head of a Boy

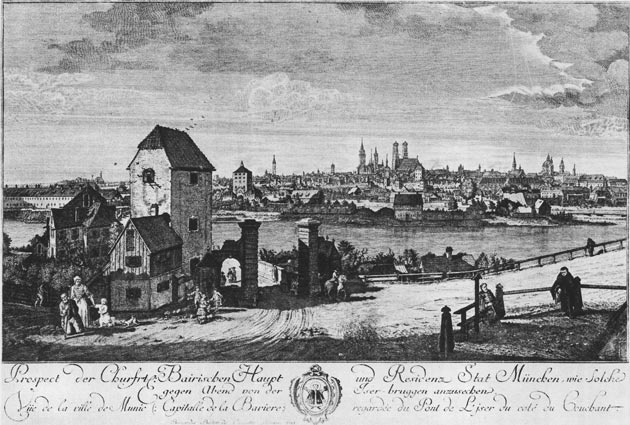
View of Munich from the Pumping Station

Franz Xaver Andreas Jungwirth (1 December 1720, Munich - 5 January 1790, Munich) was a German copper engraver and etcher.

== Life and work ==
He was the son of a Feldscher (military doctor), and learned engraving from Joseph Mörl. He began by reproducing the religious works of contemporary Bavarian artists, as well as images from churches, Andachtsbilder (devotional images), allegories, and symbolic works.

He created over eighty portrait etchings, based on the works of Giovanni Battista Piazzetta. Some sources say he created more. He also produced numerous views of Munich and Freising, loosely based on the vedute of Bernardo Bellotto. Among his most familiar works are the copperplate engraving of Franz Ignaz Oefele, the Bavarian court painter, and a depiction of the altar at St. Michael's Church; based on a work by Hans von Aachen.

His most extensive individual work involved a series of 100 etchings, inspired by Psalm 51. Designs for funeral decorations were among his miscellaneous works; along with some commissions from local book publishers.

One of his best known students was Johann Karl Schleich. His son, Maximus, was also one of his students, but he died while still quite young in 1768.

== Sources ==
- Jungwirth, Franz Xaver. In: Lorenz von Westenrieder: Beschreibung der Haupt- und Residenzstadt München im gegenwärtigen Zustande. Verlag Johann Baptist Strobl, München 1782, S. 403 (Google Books)
- Georg Kaspar Nagler, Neues allgemeines Künstler-Lexicon: oder Nachrichten von dem Leben und den Werken der Maler, Bildhauer, Baumeister, Kupferstecher etc., E. A. Fleischmann, 1838 (Google Books)
- Felix Joseph von Lipowsky: Baierisches Künstler-Lexicon. Vol.1, pg.136 (Online)
