= Marco Benefial =

Italian painter (1684–1764)

- Self-portrait, 1731, J. Paul Getty Museum, Los Angeles
- Born: 25 April 1684; Rome, Papal States
- Died: 9 April 1764 (aged 79); Rome, Papal States

Marco Benefial (25 April 1684 – 9 April 1764) was an Italian, proto-Neoclassical painter, mainly active in Rome. Benefial is best known for his repudiation of 18th century decorative Rococo styles pre-eminent in the Rome dominated by Carlo Maratta pupils. His paintings portrayed tangible human figures, with complex treatment of space, and luminous, warm colors. Along with the altarpieces and frescoes, he also painted many portraits. Because he partnered with some inferior artists who subsequently received credit, some of his paintings have been frequently misidentified.

== Life and work ==
Marco Benefial was born in Rome in 1684, and died there in 1764.

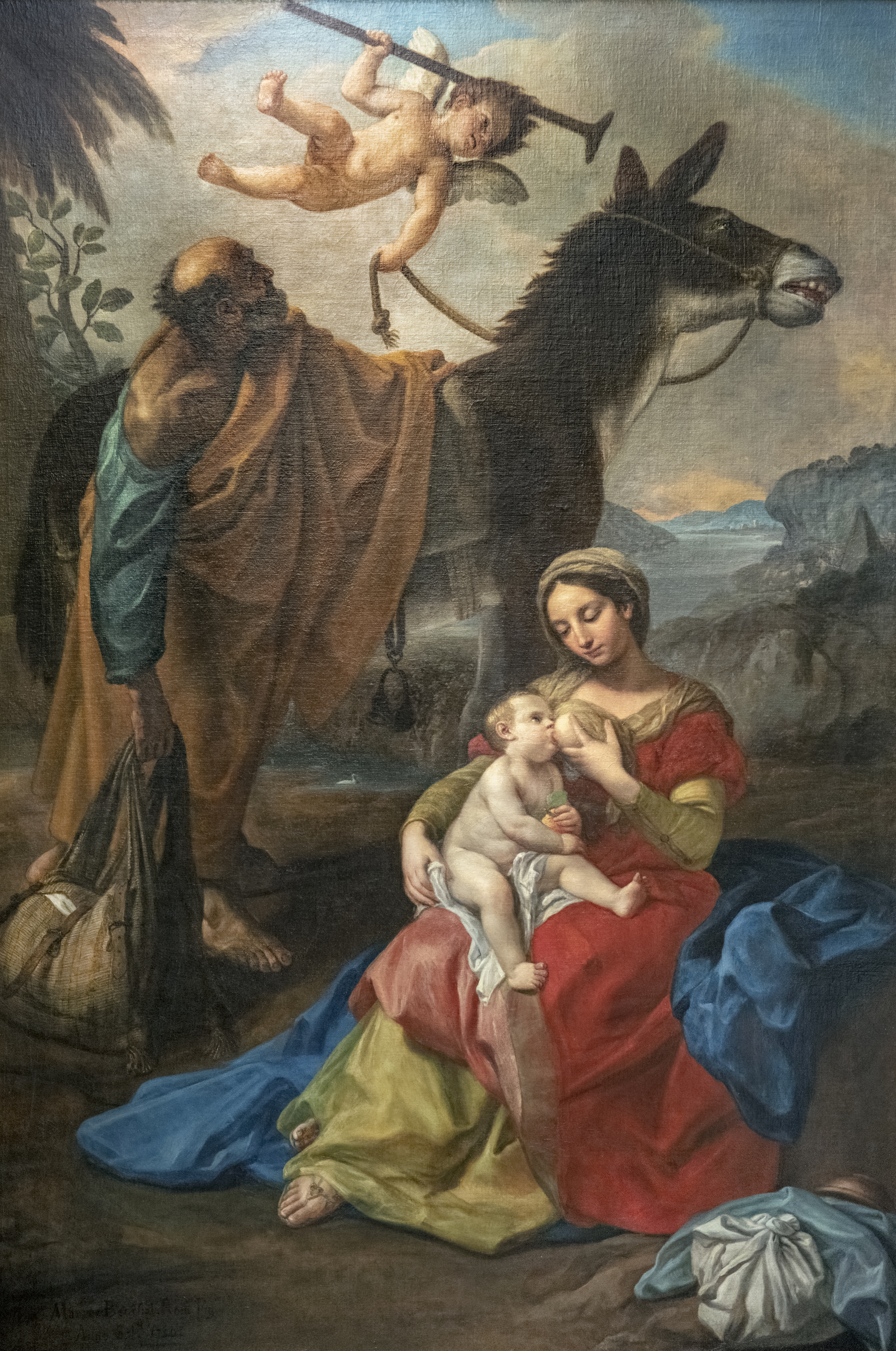
Rest of the Holy Family Musée des Beaux-Arts Carcassonne

When at the age of 19 years, one of his paintings, an altarpiece with Apotheosis of San Filippo Neri, was rejected for exhibition at the yearly Pantheon show in 1703, Benefial became incensed and displayed it in a pharmacist's window, to much commotion. In 1720, he protested the Accademia di San Luca's decree that only members or those meeting the approval of the painter's guild could teach drawing. The decree also required students to provide the academy with a fee equal to a pound of wax. His appeal to the councils of Pope Clement XI succeeded in having the ruling revoked. After Benefial was finally elected into the Accademia di San Luca at the age of 57, he soon denounced its members' mediocrity and ignorance; and was expelled years later in 1755.

In 1716, he had painted a San Saturnino for the church of Santi Giovanni e Paolo (Rome). His 1718 papal commission for a Jonah, painted for Basilica of St. John Lateran, was rewarded also by the papacy with the title of Cavaliere. During 1720-1727, he completed painting on the Story of san Lorenzo for the Duomo of Viterbo. In 1721, he completed a Pieta with angels & symbols of the passion for the church in the monastery of Santa Maria dei Sette Dolori. He painted for the church of Santa Maria alle Fornaci, two lunettes on the story of John the Baptist. From 1722-1727, he completed four canvases for the Collegiata del Crocifix in Monreale. In 1729-1732, he painted two canvases of Santa Margherita da Cortona for the church of Santa Maria in Aracoeli, as commissioned by cardinal Pietro Marcello Corradini. He often collaborated in paintings with Filippo Evangelista.

His initial training in Rome was under Bonaventura Lamberti, a pupil of Carlo Cignani, and he helped in the painting of the Chapel of the Sacrament in Saint Peter's Basilica and in the Carmelite Convent of San Alberto.

He is remembered for urging a return to the classical foundations of Italian painting, as exemplified by Raphael, del Sarto, and Carracci. Among his pupils were Anton Mengs, Antonio Liozzi, Giovanni Battista Ponfredi, Gioacchino Martorana, Mariano Rossi, and the English portrait painter, John Parker.

== Gallery of images ==
Domine, quo vadis?, 1733, Nationalmuseum, Stockholm

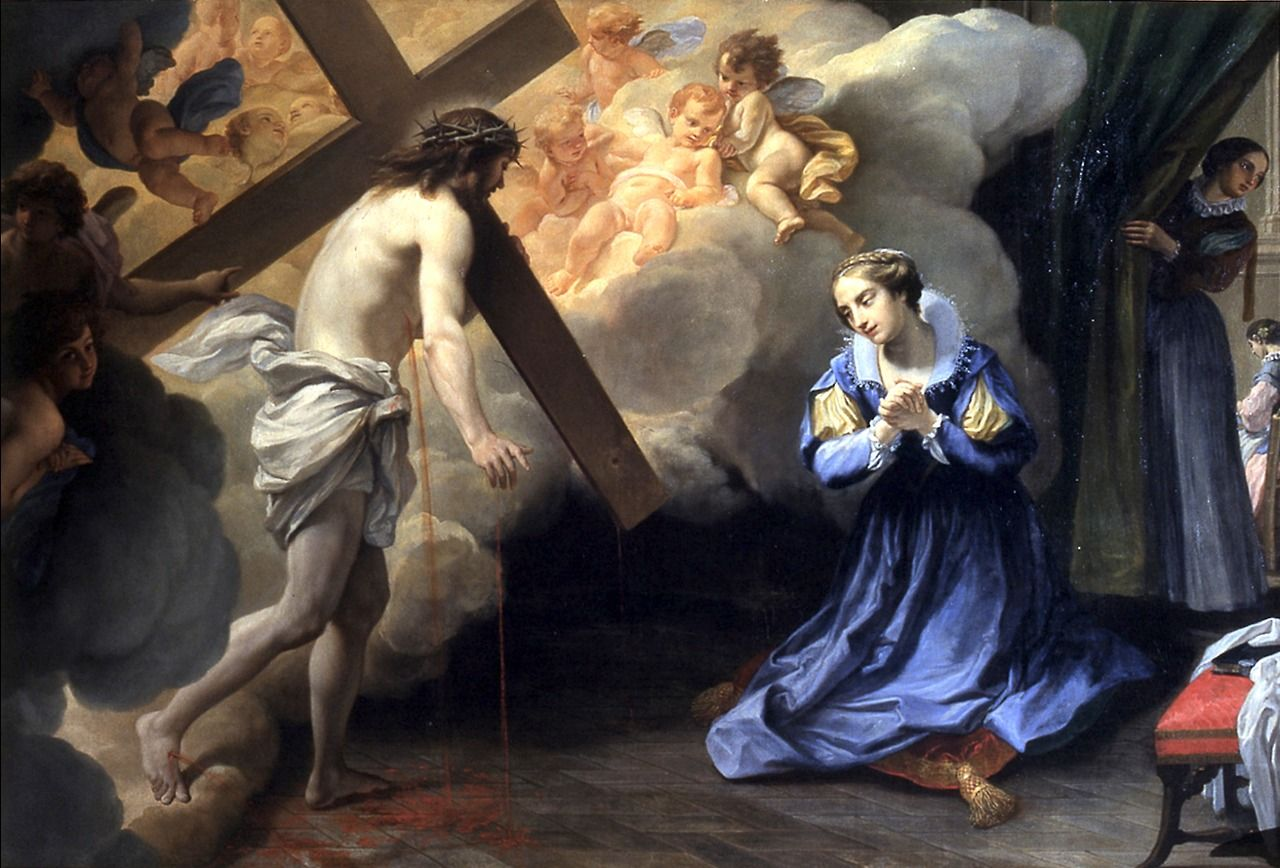
The vision ot St. Catherine of Genoa, 1747, Palazzo Corsini, Rome

Pyramus and Thisbe, 1735-40, Galleria Barberini, Rome

Portrait of John Parker, 1761, Accademia di San Luca, Rome

Portrait of an Old Woman, Palazzo Buonaccorsi, Macerata

St. Margaret of Cortona Finds the Corpse of her Lover, 1737-40, Musée Fesch, Ajaccio

== See Also ==
- Sebastiano Conca
- Pompeo Batoni
- Jacopo Zoboli
