= Balthasar Augustin Albrecht =

German painter

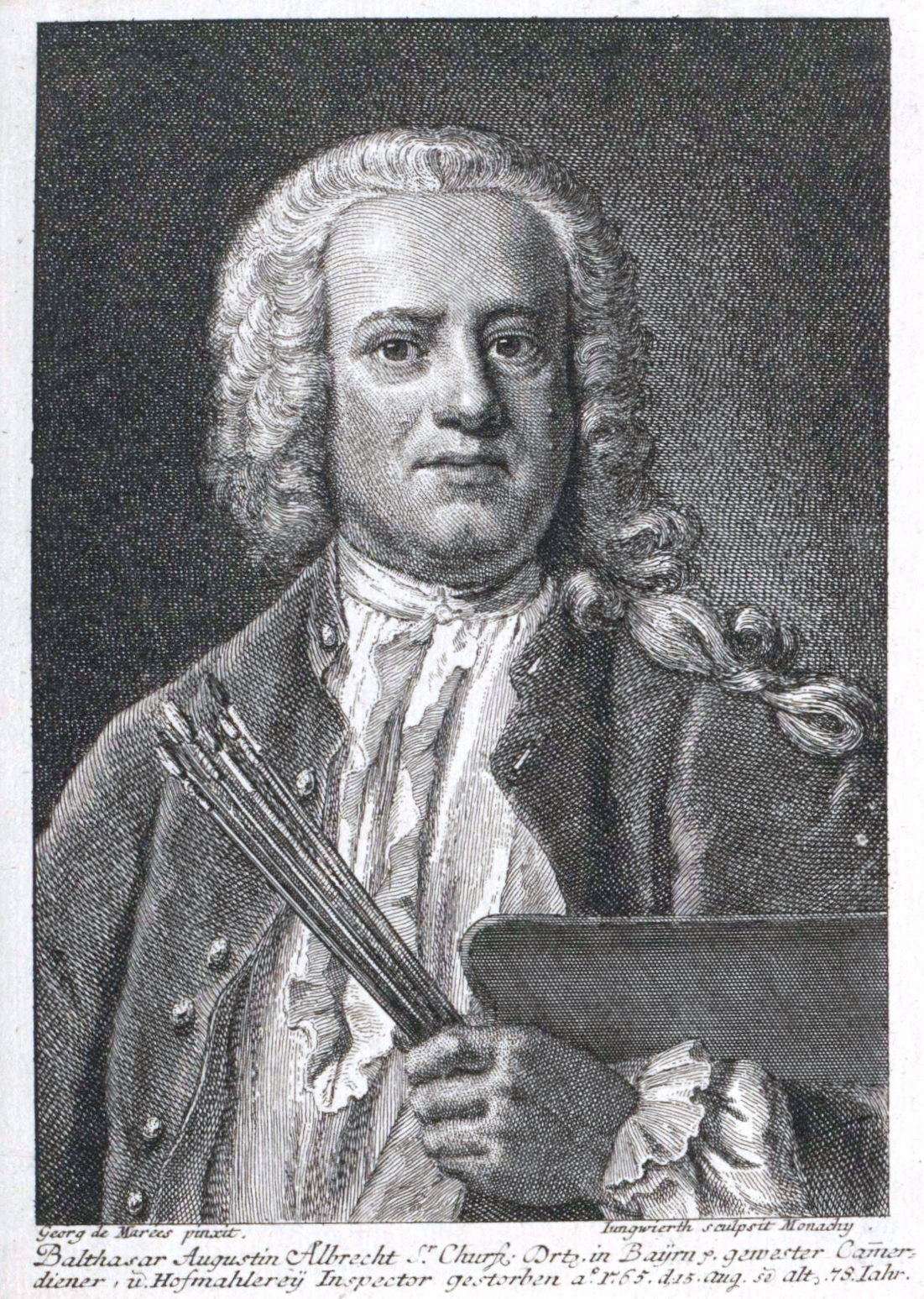
- Born: 3 January 1687; Berg
- Died: 15 August 1765 (aged 78); Munich
- Occupation: Painter, court painter

Balthasar Augustin Albrecht (1687– 1765) was a German painter.

== Life ==
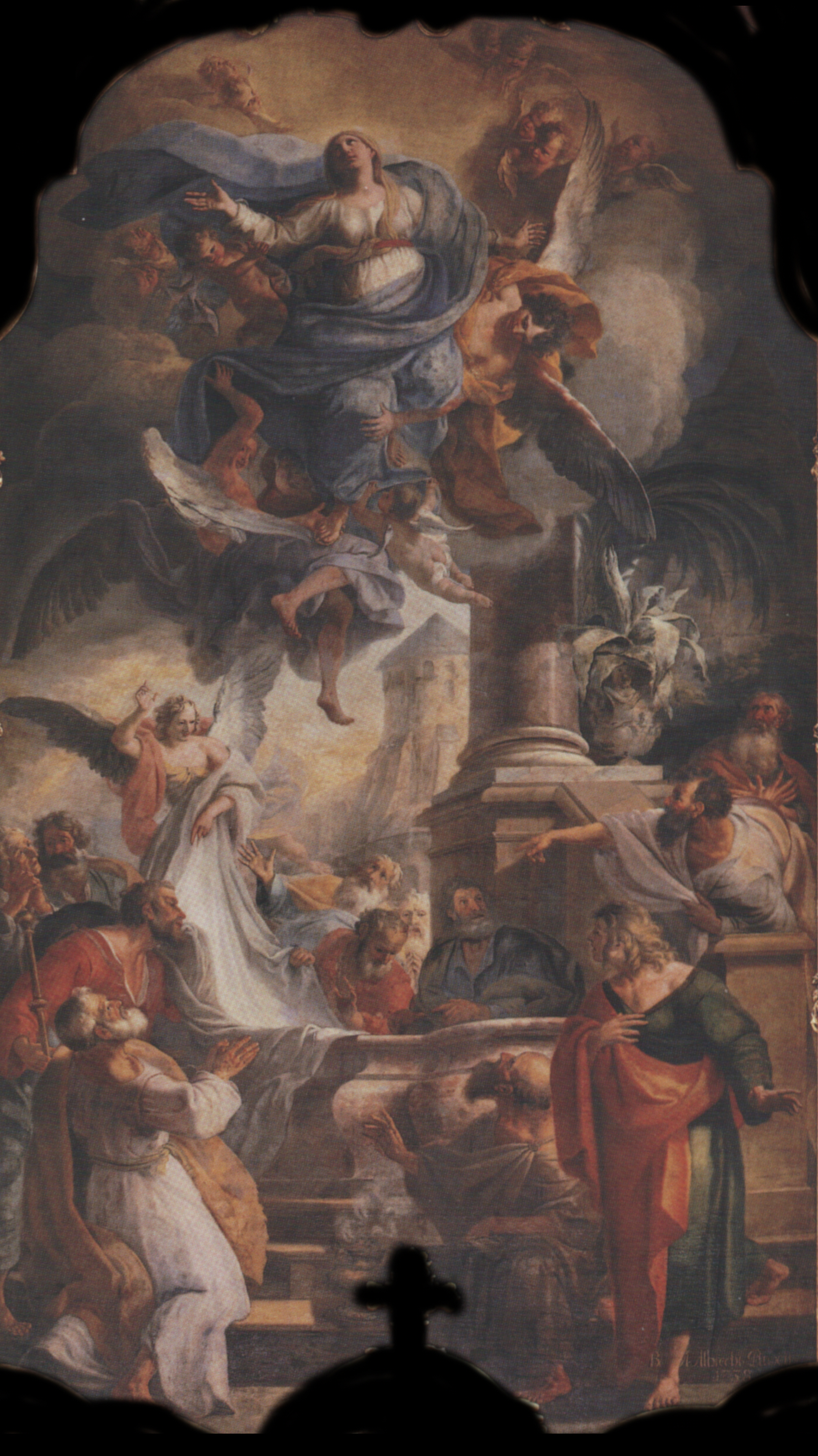
Altar piece from Dießen am Ammersee showing the Assumption of Mary, from 1738

Albrecht, who was born at Berg, near Aufkirchen in Bavaria, in 1687, was a pupil of Nikolaus Gottfried Stuber, and studied in Venice and Rome. On his return to Germany in 1719, he became popular as an historical painter, and was appointed court-painter and inspector of the Picture Gallery at Munich, where he died in 1765.
