= Vision of Constantine (Stavarkis) =

Painting by Stylianos Stavrakis

The Vision of Constantine
- Το Όραμα του Κωνσταντίνου (Greek), Visione di Costantino (Italian)
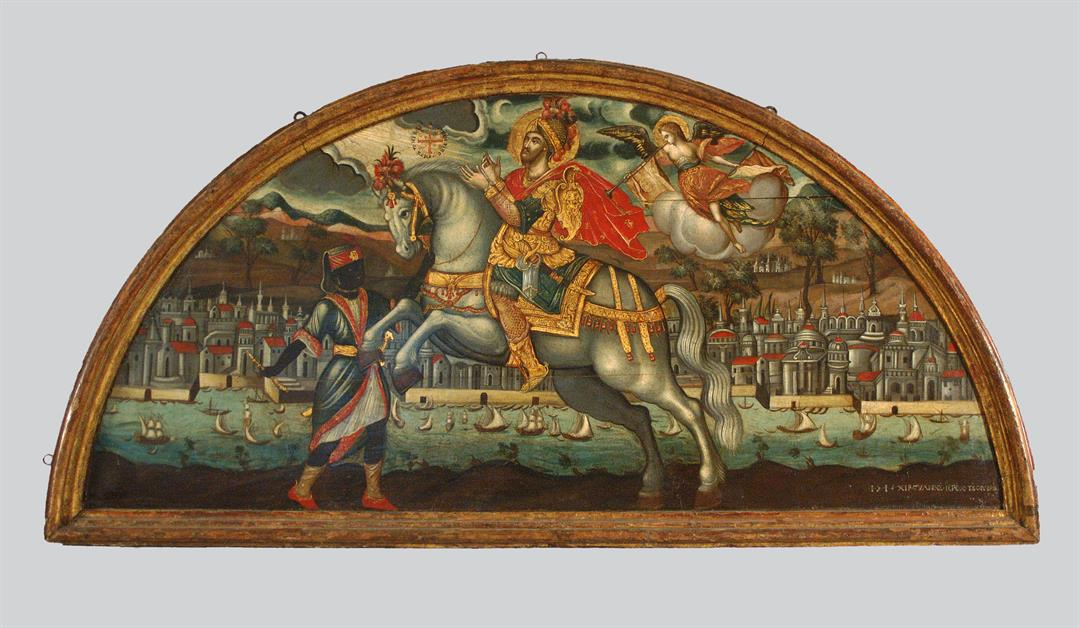
- Artist: Stylianos Stavrakis
- Year: 1725 - 1786
- Medium: Tempera on Wood
- Movement: Heptanese School
- Subject: The Vision of Constantine
- Dimensions: 86 cm × 174 cm (33.8 in × 68.5 in)
- Location: Byzantine and Christian Museum, Athens, Greece
- Owner: Byzantine and Christian Museum
- Accession: ΒΧΜ 01588
- Website: Official Website

Vision of Constantine (Stavarkis) is a tempera painting created by Greek painter and goldsmith Stylianos Stavrakis. Stavrakis was a major representative of the Heptanese school. Many of his works were completed on the Ionian islands namely Zakynthos. He was active during the 1700s. He was from a prominent family of painters His student was his nephew famous Greek painter Demetrios Stavrakis.

Emperor Constantine and his army were at war with the Roman Emperor Maxentius. According to legend, Constantine prayed with his army and a cross appeared in the sky. A miraculous inscription appeared in the sky: Ἐν τούτῳ νίκα (En to tow nika) the translation is by this sign, you will conquer. In Stavraki's rendition, an angel appears playing a horn. A cross is also present. Emperor Constantine and his troops were astounded by the phenomenon. Constantine was victorious at the Battle of the Milvian Bridge. Upon his victory, he was crowned the new emperor. He triumphantly entered Rome. His victory marked the end of the persecution of Christians. Innumerable works depicting the miraculous event were completed by Greek and Italian artists.

A popular version with the aforementioned theme was completed by Raphael's assistants not long after his death called The Vision of the Cross. Famous Greek painter Elias Moskos also completed a notable version of The Vision of Constantine (Moskos). Mosko's work influenced Stavraki's painting. Italian sculptor Bernini completed a sculpture of The Vision of Constantine. Both Moskos and Stavraki's paintings resemble Bernini's magnificent work. Stavraki's work is currently part of the collection of the Byzantine and Christian Museum. Mosko's painting is housed at the same museum.

== History ==
Vision of Constantine is a tempera painting on wood panel in the form of an arch. The height of the work is 86 cm (33.8 in) and the width is 174 cm (68.5 in). The painting was used to fill an archway in a church in Zakynthos. A large number of vessels are present in the water as the battle is about to ensue. A city looms in the background. The artist carefully paints the structures indicating a saturated city possibly Rome. The horse is greeted by a soldier. He is dressed in ostentatious attire.

The gold of Constantine's militaristic attire is representative of the celestial realm from which he descended. Constantine's imperial uniform exhibits intricate ornamentation and brilliant colors. His cape flows in a weightless setting. The gold decoration illustrates Constantine's majestic divinity. The horse is sculpturesque as it rests on its hind legs. The emperor's hand gestures are similar in Moskos and Stavraki's paintings. Both works also resemble Bernini's equestrian statue of Constantine The Vision of Constantine. All three versions of The Vision of Constantine convey a unique hand gesture of prayer. An angel is behind the Constantine playing a horn while he gazes at a cross in the sky with the famous Greek inscription. Ἐν τούτῳ νίκα (En to tow nika) the translation is by this sign, you will conquer.

== Gallery ==
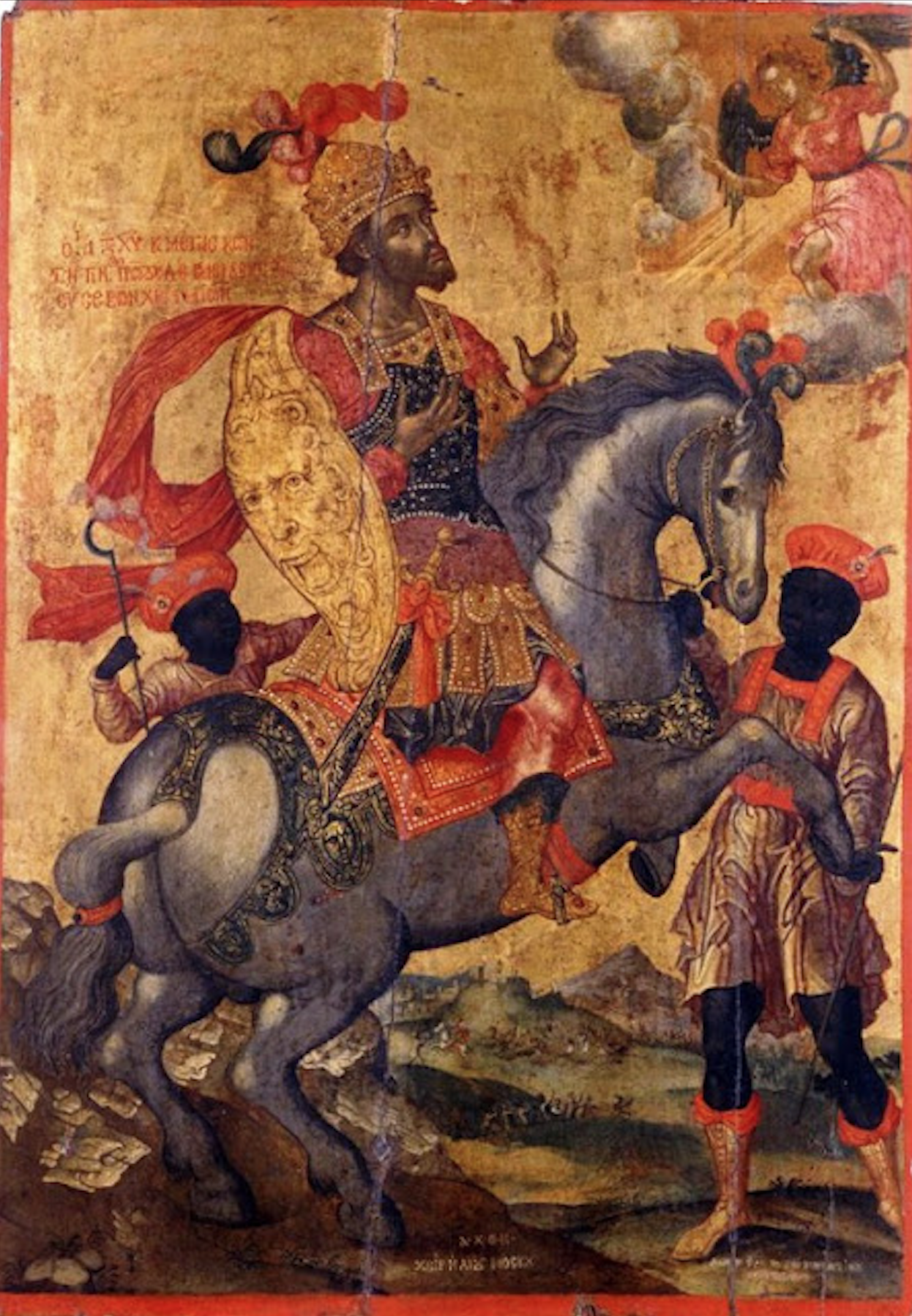
Vision of Constantine Moskos

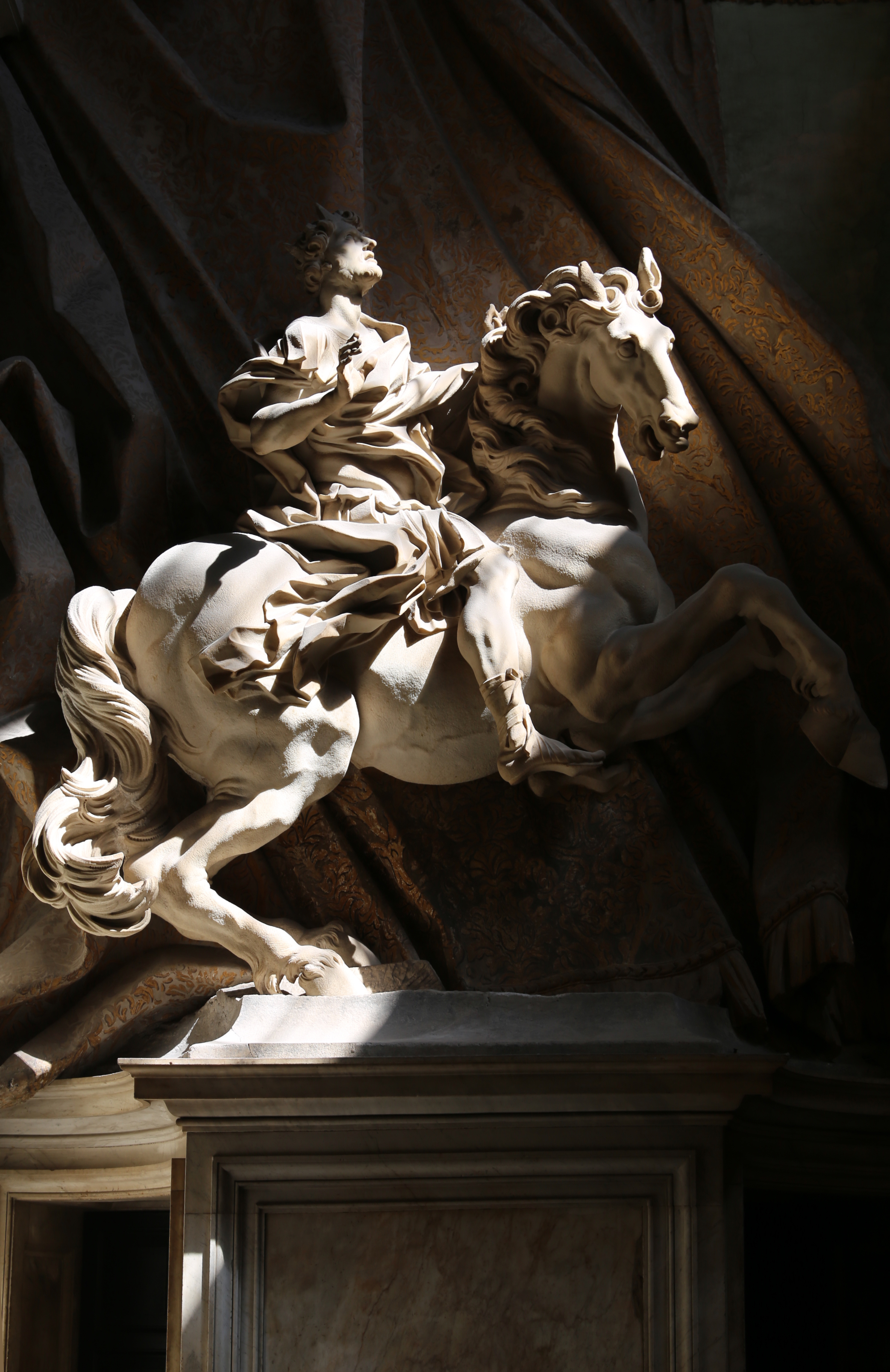
Vision of Constantine Bernini

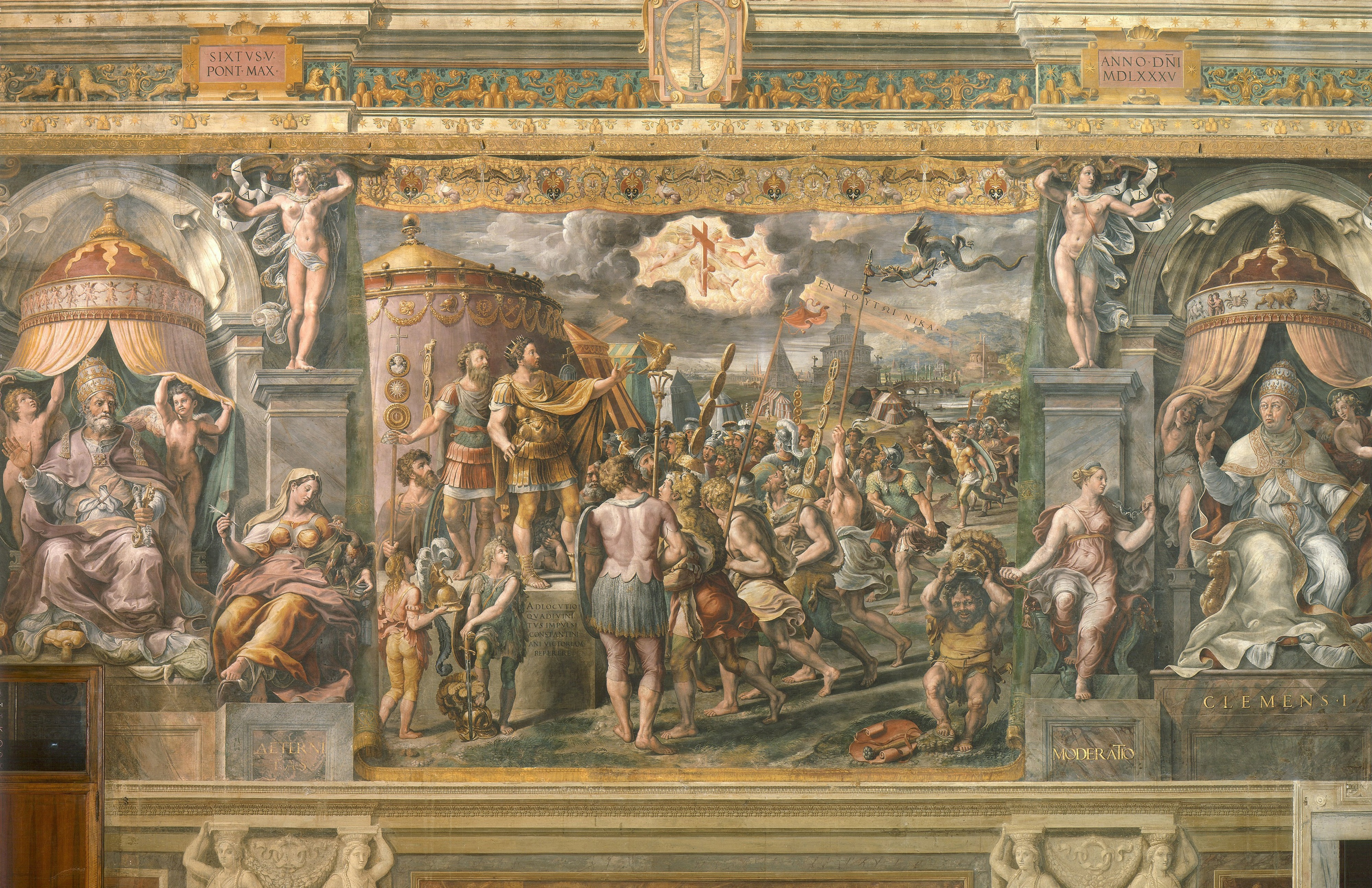
The Vision of the Cross Raphael's Students
