= The Deposition from the Cross (Stavrakis) =

Painting by Stylianos Stavrakis

- Αποκαθήλωση (Greek), Deposizione di Gesù (Italian)
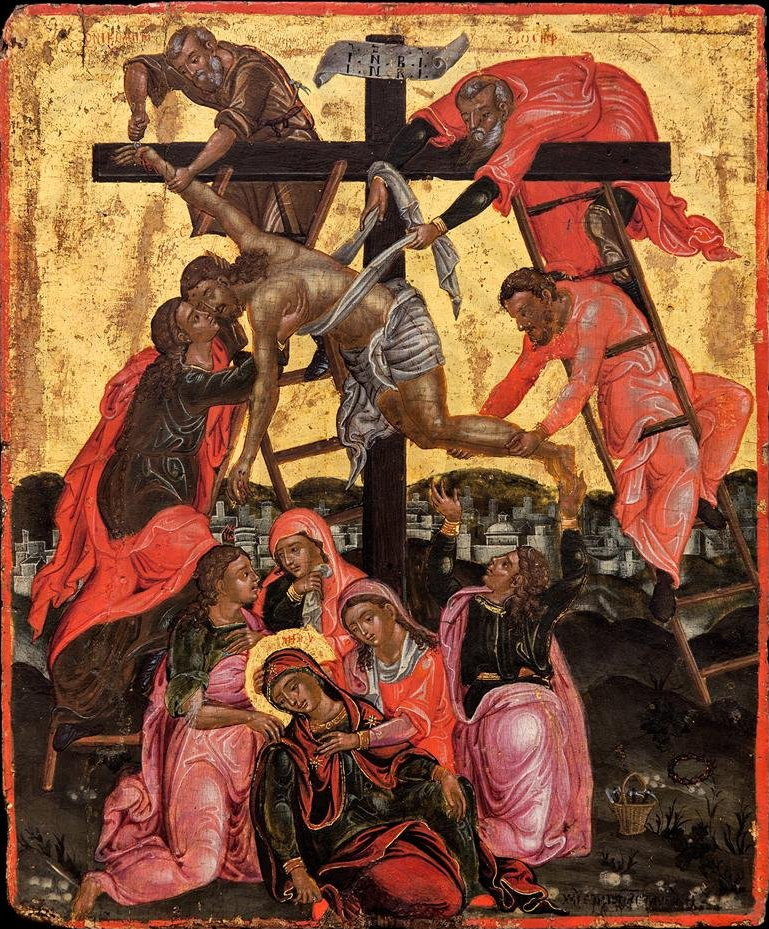
- Artist: Stylianos Stavrakis
- Year: 1729–1786
- Medium: tempera on wood
- Movement: Heptanese School
- Subject: The Deposition from the Cross
- Dimensions: 38.3 cm × 23.5 cm (15 in × 9.2 in)
- Location: Benaki Museum, Athens, Greece
- Owner: Benaki Museum
- Website: Official website

The Deposition from the Cross or Descent from the Cross is a tempera painting created by Greek painter Stylianos Stavrakis. He was active during the early part of the 1700s. His nephew and brother were also famous painters. His nephew Demetrios Stavrakis was also his pupil. He was also a goldsmith. Most of his works were completed on the island of Zakynthos. He was a representative of the Heptanese school and Greek Rococo. Fourteen of his paintings survived.

Countless Greek and Italian paintings have been created representing Christ on the cross. The Descent from the Cross is part of the Passion series. The Deposition from the Cross shows the moment when Christ's body is removed from the cross and taken for burial. Artists have artistically reanimated the event in paintings. Well-known versions include works by Duccio, Ioannis Apakas, and Nikolaos Kantounis. Stavraki's painting can be found in Athens Greece at the Benaki Museum.

== History ==
The Descent from the Cross is made of tempera paint, wood panel, and gold leaf. The height is 38.3 cm (15 in) and the width is 23.5 cm (9.2 in). The painting features an evolved sophisticated technique. The figures are painted with careful detail. Ioannis Apakas's Descent from the Cross features flattened surfaces in line with the maniera greca. A shallow stage illustrates a series of ridges, furrows, or diagonal lines. The figures exhibit a simplistic tone prevalent in the Cretan School but more refined than Byzantine art. Stavraki takes Apaka's version one step further adding luxuriant patterns, brilliant colors, and lavish costumes. The figure of Jesus suspended by a mere piece of cloth is sculpturesque, simple, and weighty. Stavraki's work is comparable to Duccio's Descent from the Cross. Jerusalem is in the background, and three ladders are present. There are nine figures around Christ. There are many women at the crucifixion around Mary. The Three Marys are present at the event. One woman embraces Jesus's dead body as he descends the cross. The Virgin is at the bottom of the icon to the left of the cross. The postures and gestures of the figures denote a scene filled with sorrow and despair.

== Gallery ==
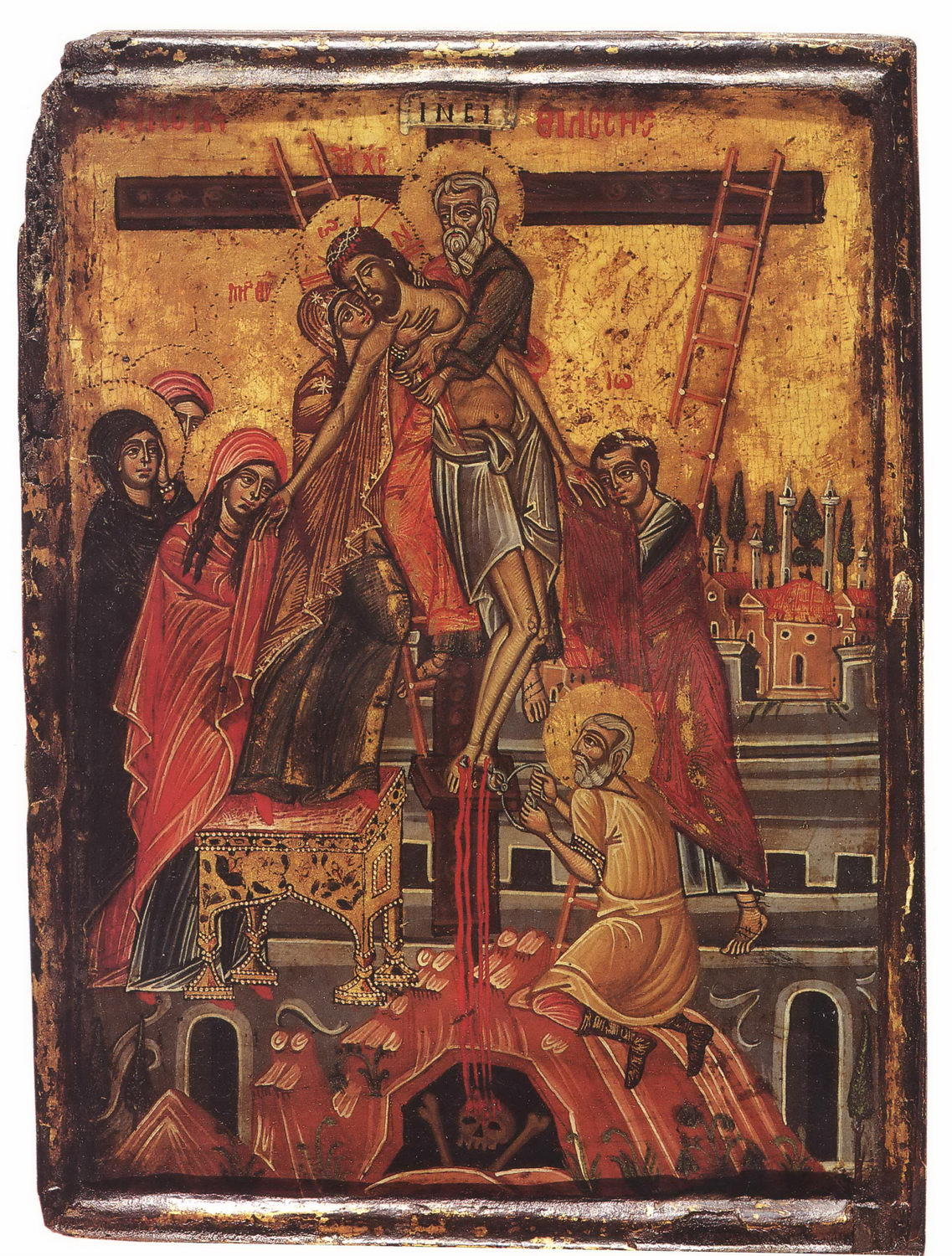
Descent from the Cross Apakas

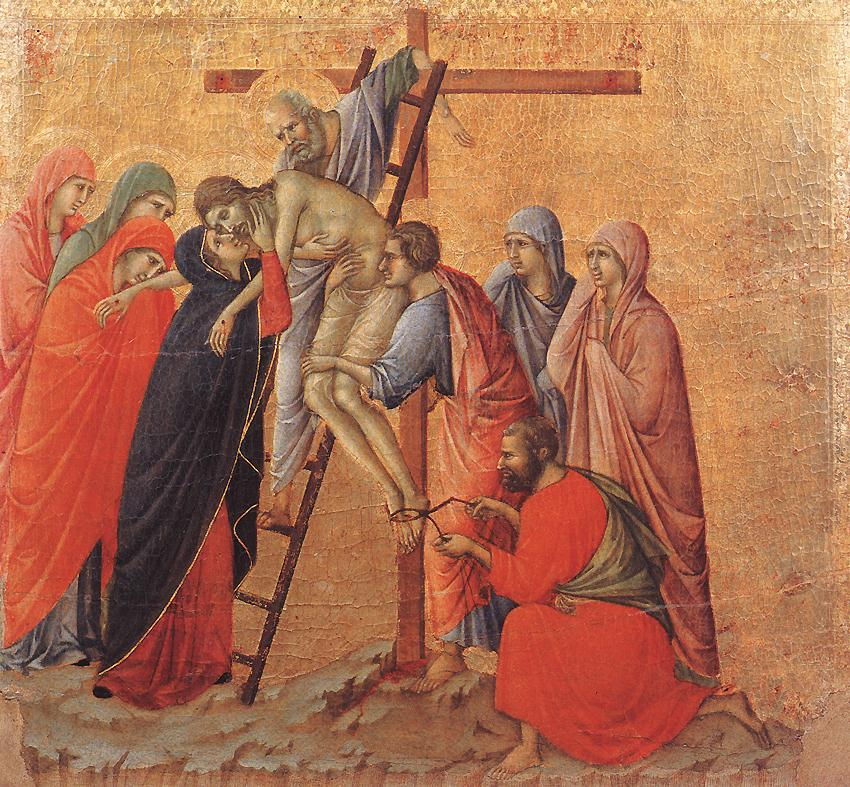
Descent from the Cross Duccio

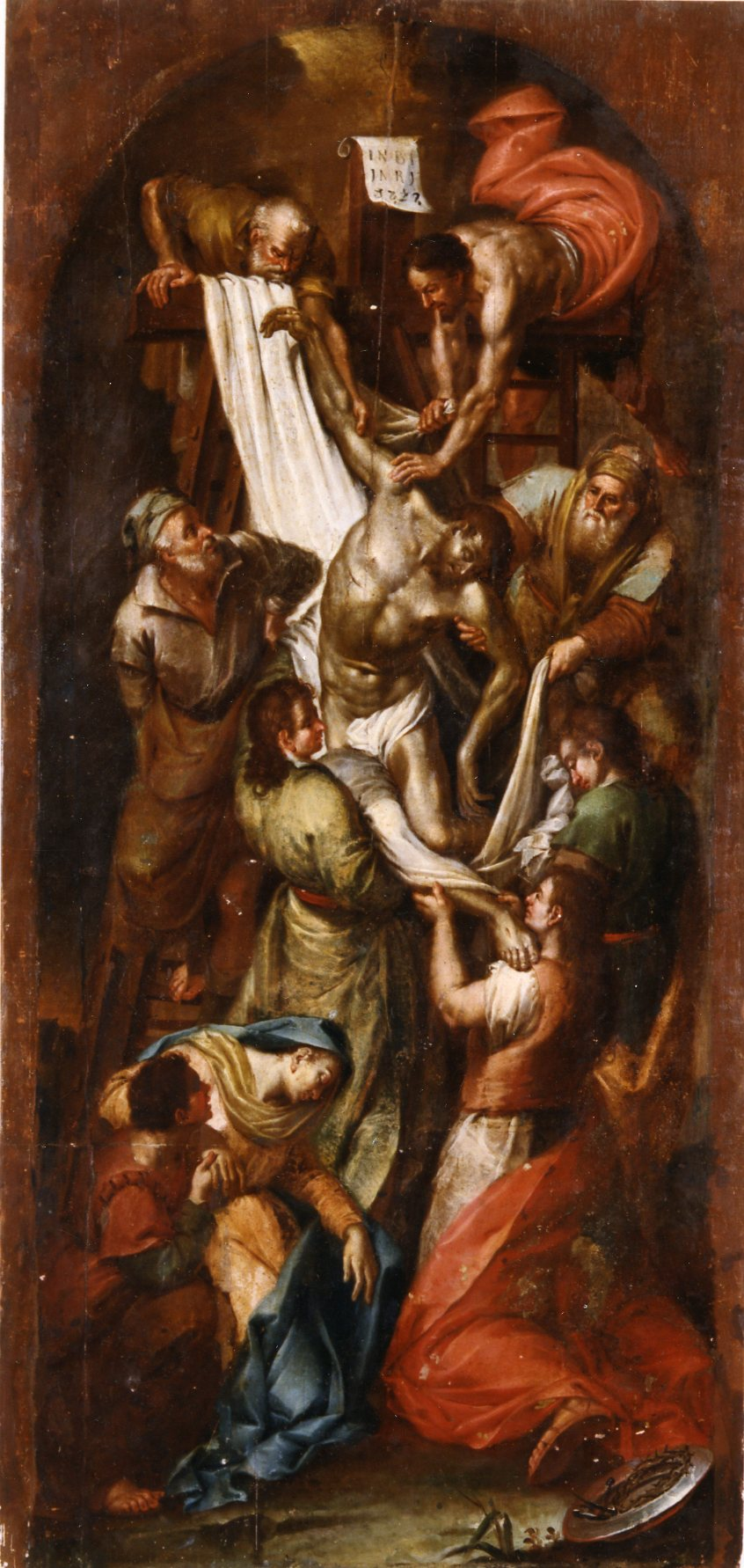
Descent from the Cross Kantounis
