= The Vision of Constantine (Moskos) =

Painting by Elias Moskos

- Το Όραμα του Κωνσταντίνου (Greek), Visione di Costantino (Italian)
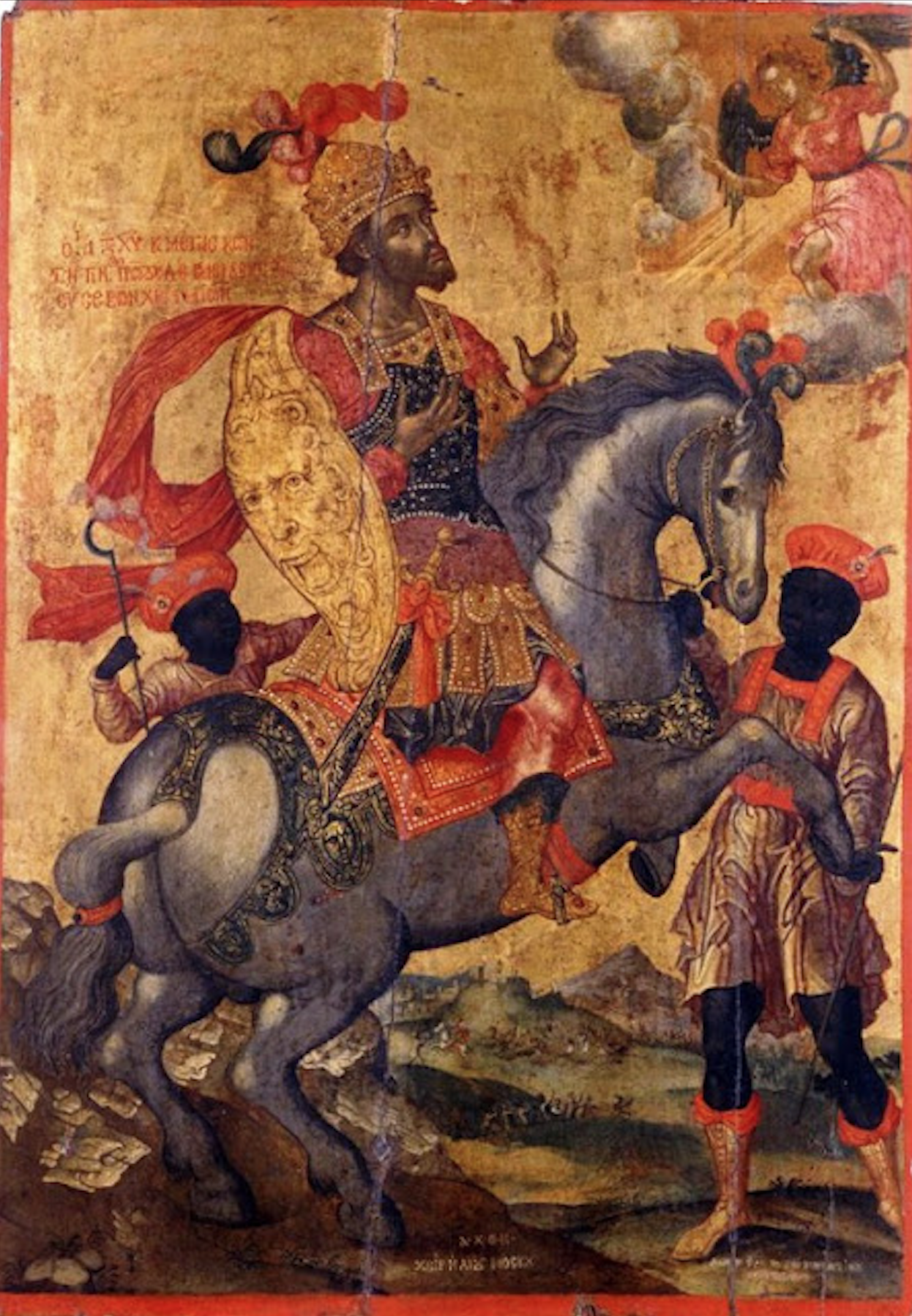
- Artist: Elias Moskos
- Year: 1678
- Medium: tempera on wood
- Movement: Late Cretan school
- Subject: The Vision of Constantine
- Dimensions: 72 cm × 28.3 cm (51 in × 20 in)
- Location: Byzantine and Christian Museum, Athens, Greece
- Owner: Byzantine and Christian Museum

The Vision of Constantine was an egg tempera painting created by Elias Moskos. Moskos was active during the 17th century. Fifty-two paintings are attributed to the artist. He was active on the Greek islands of Crete and Zakynthos. He is one of the few artists that belongs to the Cretan school and the Heptanese (Ionian) school. Constantine is one of the most important figures in the Christian religion. He was the first Roman emperor to accept the new faith. He has been depicted in art since the inception of the new religion. He is often depicted with his mother Helen. The Vision of Constantine was very popular in Greek and Italian art.

Constantine and his army were at war with Roman Emperor Maxentius. Constantine was praying with his army. According to legend, a cross appeared in the sky, above the Sun. There was also an inscription: Ἐν τούτῳ νίκα (En to tow nika) the translation was by this sign, you will conquer. In Mosko's rendition, an angel appears relaying the message of the cross to Emperor Constantine. Constantine and his troops were astonished by the miracle. Constantine won the Battle of Milvian Bridge. After his victory, the new emperor entered Rome and stopped persecuting Christians.

Numerous works were completed by Greek and Italian artists. A popular version was completed by Raphael’s assistants after his death called The Vision of the Cross. A notable statue of The Vision of Constantine was completed by Bernini eight years before Mosko's work. Moskos was influenced by Antonio Tempesta's engravings Orlando Furioso. He was a Florentine painter and engraver active during the 1500s. The work was completed in 1597. The engravings were a series of eight equestrian portraits of the subjects in Ariosto’s famous work Orlando Furioso. Mosko's Vision of Constantine influenced a notable version by Greek painter Stylianos Stavrakis. Mosko's work is currently part of the Dionysios Loverdos Collection at the Byzantine and Christian Museum.

== Description ==
The painting is made of egg tempera and gold leaf on wood panel. The portable icon was completed in 1678. The height is 72 cm (51 in) and the width is 28.3 cm (20 in). The horse of Constantine displays a coloristic resemblance to the horses in Konstantinos Paleokapas Crucifixion. The artist implements a unique array of colors common to the Late Cretan School. The horse's pose is statuesque. Similarities exist between the engraving named Il Danese Paladino by Antonio Tempesta. Two of the engravings in the series named Orlando Furioso are similar to Mosko's work. The other one is called Marfisa Guerriera. Moskos mixes both engravings to create an elaborate blend of the Florentine-influenced masterpiece.

The artists attempt to introduce elaborate early byzantine attire. A grotesque mask appears on Constantine’s shield. The Roman emperor's attire is elaborately decorated. He is greeted by two soldiers, both of the soldiers hold weapons, one holds a crescent moon spear. They are dressed in silk. The valley in the background and the orientation of figures creates an ambient space. The painter eloquently adds dimension to his work. There is a battle scene in the background. Constantine is shown a second time. The artist eloquently depicts the miniature scene in the background adding depth to his work. An epic battle is waged outside of a fortified city among the hilltops.

Constantine’s hands are open while he accepts his vision the work slightly resembles Bernini's Constantine. Both works of art feature the artist gesturing his hands in a similar fashion. An angel appears in the clouds relaying the message to Constantine. The work is an excellent example of a Greek painter mixing the maniera greca with Italian mannerisms. Cretan and Ionian art was typically influenced by Venetian painting. In this rare case, the work was influenced by a Florentine painter. The work symbolizes a breaking point from the Cretan School and a transition to the more refined artistic style prevalent in the Heptanese school.

The work is first described in 1902. It was at the church of Saint Basil in Apano, Zakinthos. In 1933, the masterpiece was part of the Dionysios Loverdos Collection. The collection was transferred to the Byzantine and Christian Museum of Athens in 1979. The work of art has been maintained by the institution.

== Gallery ==
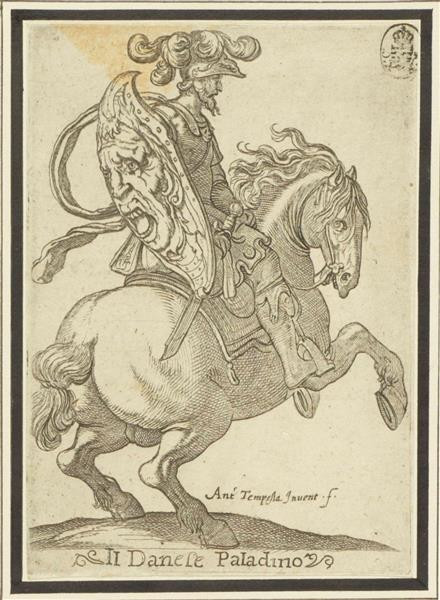
Il Danese Paladino Tempesta's (Orlando Furioso)

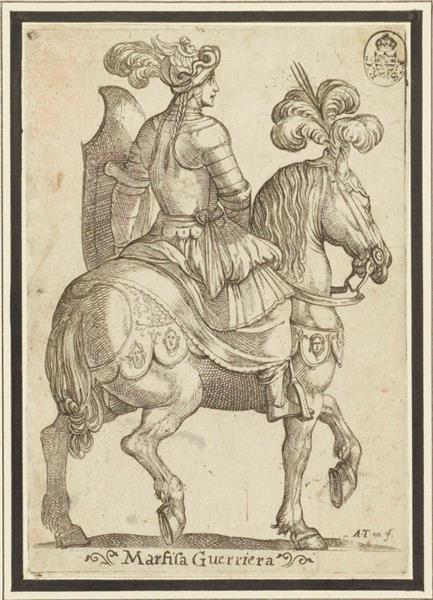
Marfisa Tempesta's (Orlando Furioso)

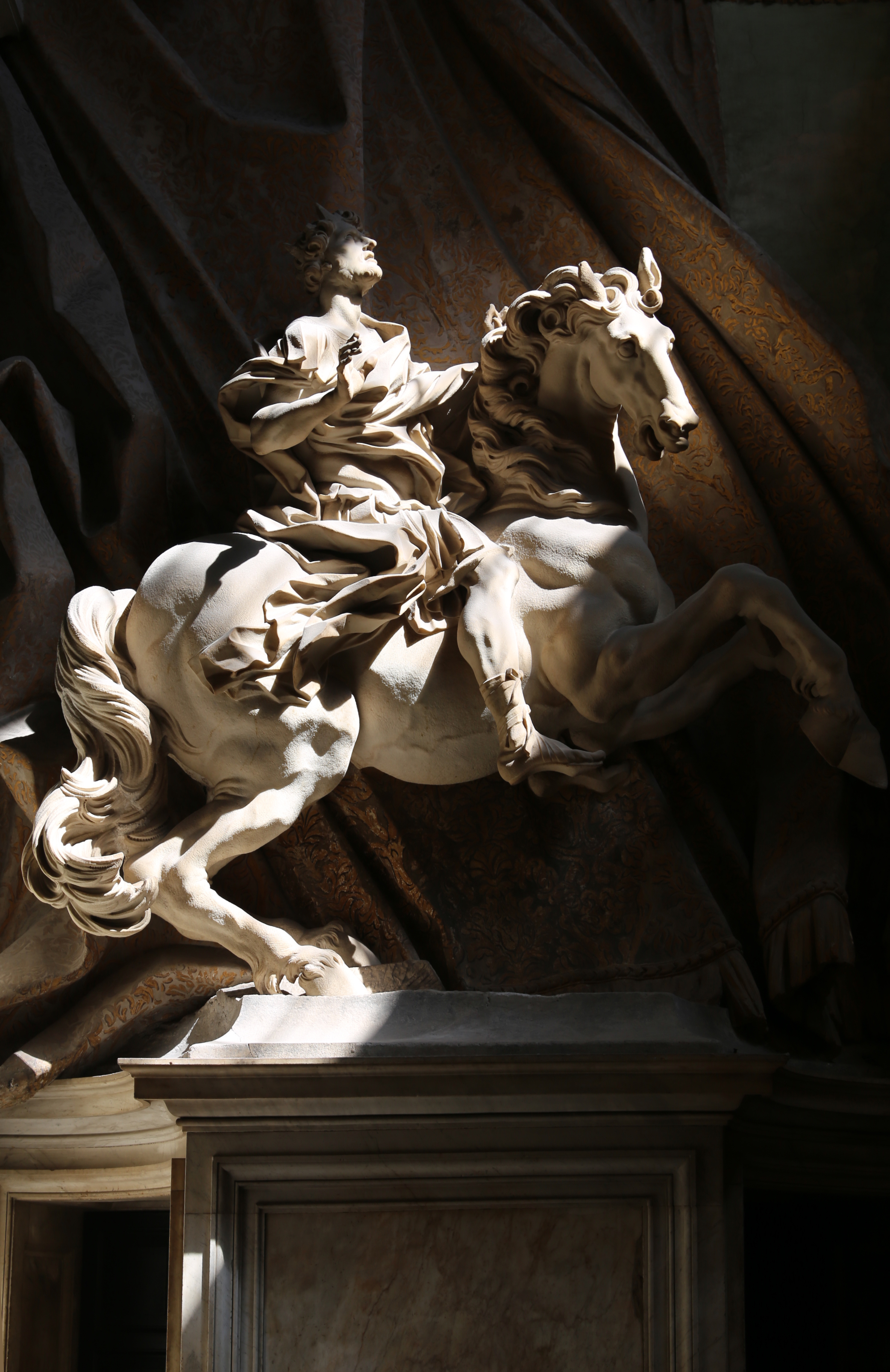
Vision of Constantine, Bernini

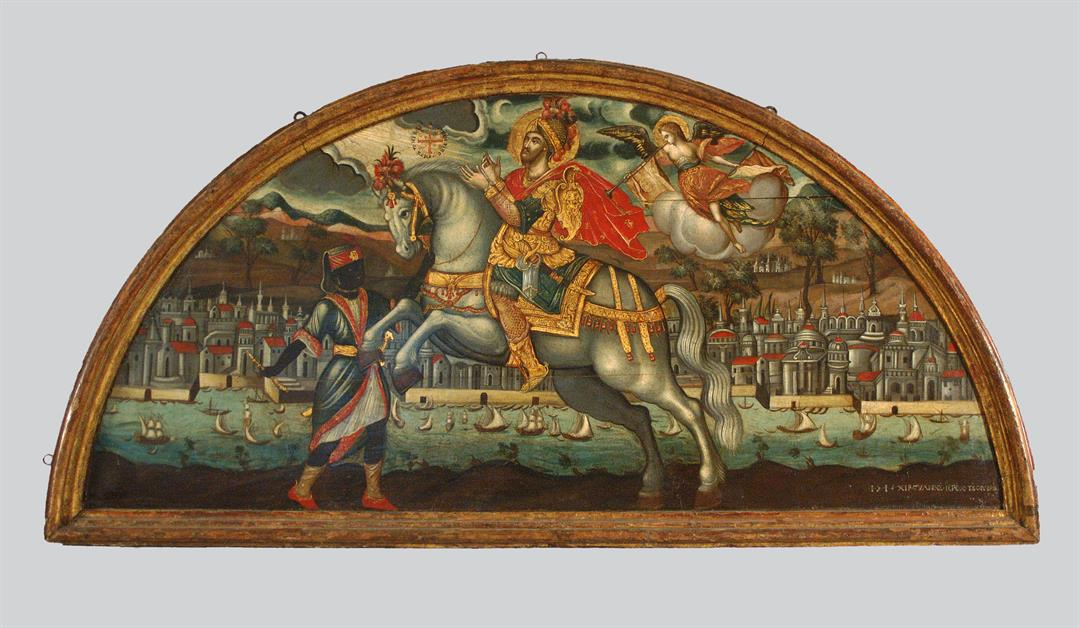
Vision of Constantine Stavrakis
