= Equestrian statue of Louis XIV (Bernini) =

Sculpture by Gian Lorenzo Bernini

Equestrian Statue of King Louis XIV
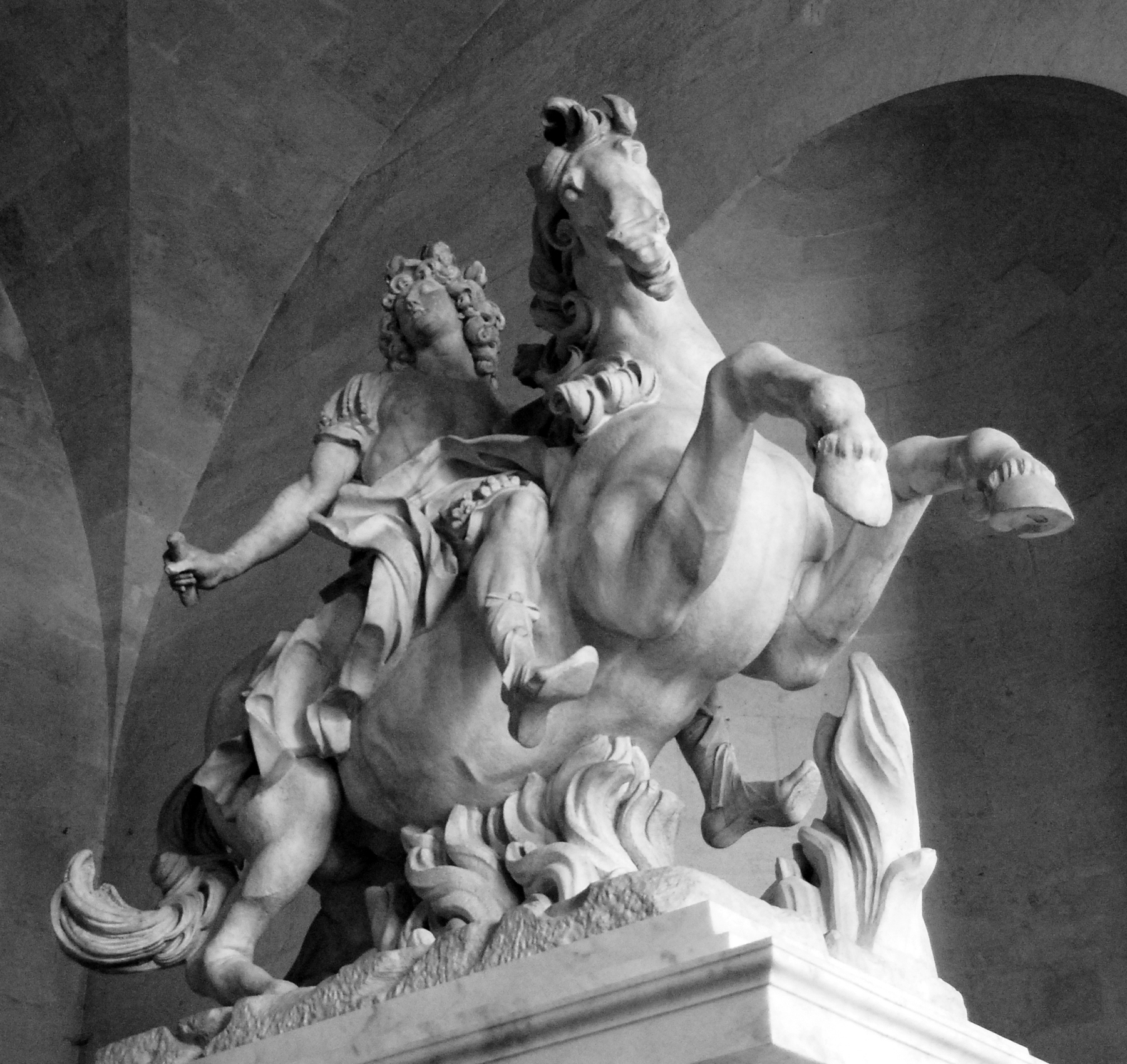
- Artist: Gian Lorenzo Bernini
- Year: 1665–1684
- Catalogue: 74
- Type: Sculpture
- Medium: Marble
- Subject: Louis XIV
- Location: Palace of Versailles, Versailles; 48°48′15.8″N 2°7′23.3″E
- Preceded by: The Vision of Constantine (Bernini)
- Followed by: Bust of Gabriele Fonseca

The Equestrian Statue of King Louis XIV is a sculpture designed and partially executed by the Italian artist Gian Lorenzo Bernini. Bernini first discussed the project while in France in the mid-1660s, but it did not start until later in the decade, when back in Rome. It was not completed until 1684 and then shipped to Paris in 1685. Louis XIV was extremely unhappy with the result and had it placed in a corner of the gardens of Versailles. Soon after, the sculpture was modified by François Girardon and altered into an equestrian sculpture of the ancient Roman hero Marcus Curtius.

== History ==
=== Invitation ===
For much of the 17th century, Bernini was regarded as the premier artist of the era, serving as the primary source of artistic works commissioned by Pope Urban VIII. As a result, Louis XIV invited him to come to France to work in the name of the French monarchy. Bernini accepted this invitation, traveling to Paris to construct an equestrian statue and a portrait bust, as well as a new façade of the Louvre Palace.

=== Bernini in France ===
The day after his arrival in Paris on June 3, 1665, Bernini concluded that the work that had been already done on the Louvre by Louis Le Vau, a French Classical Baroque architect who had been hired by Louis XIV, was inadequate, deciding instead to create his own designs, citing his own observations of palaces throughout his career. Bernini would eventually propose to abandon Le Vau’s ongoing project, instead insisting that he would provide the design details himself.

Bernini's first concept for the planned east façade, which placed a heavy emphasis on curved wings in the Italian style, was almost immediately rejected. Jean-Baptiste Colbert also stated that Bernini's plans to place the King's own room in the outwardly protruding central pavilion would be a noisy location due to its close proximity to the nearby street and foot traffic. Following the rejection of the first draft, Bernini sent in a second draft which too was rejected by Colbert, though unlike the first and the third drafts an image does not appear to have survived. The third and final draft, which had eliminated the curved wings that Bernini initially envisioned, was praised by Louis, who had held a formal ceremony to lay the cornerstone of the new façade. However, as soon as Bernini left France to return to Rome, Louis ordered the construction to stop.

=== Construction and creation ===
Bernini followed French tradition creating equestrian statues of French kings in their own residences, with notable examples by François Mansart, Charles Perrault, and Pierre Cottard. Despite tradition, Bernini was the first in France to design an equestrian statue to be freestanding with a rearing horse rather than attached to building. The precedent for this was Pietro Tacca's sculpture of Philip IV of Spain in the Parque del Buen Retiro, Madrid (1642) which had been considered to be the first equestrian monument displaying a rearing rider since antiquity. This emulation reflected the Franco-Spanish rivalry during the reign of King Louis XIV.

In many images that capture the likeness of Louis XIV, the principal component was the metaphor of Louis’ reign, the sun, which conforms to the tradition of the oriens augusti, or “the rising of the august one”, a term that identifies a ruler with the sun. The sun was also one of many symbols for Pope Urban VIII, Bernini’s greatest patron. In his time serving Urban VIII, Bernini was involved in the design of a frescoed vault within the Palazzo Barberini in Rome in which Divine Wisdom appears with the symbol of the sun on her breast.

=== Transportation and arrival in France ===
In the fall of 1684, the statue was shipped from Civitavecchia by boat. In March 1685, the statue arrived in Paris. The statue was then shipped to Versailles during August and September, arriving at the palace on October 1, 1685. By the ninth, the statue was placed in the Versailles Orangerie, in one of the galleries there.

=== Reception ===
On 14 November 1685, Louis XIV saw the statue for the first time in the orangerie, Philippe de Courcillon recorded that the King had resolved to remove the statue from the grounds and to destroy it. The statue, however, was not destroyed, but moved to another location on the main axis of the Orangerie, south of the pool. In September 1686, Bernini’s statue was displaced by Domenico Guidi’s La Renommee de Louis XIV. The statue was moved to a location on the far side of the newly constructed Neptune Basin, the most northern point on the north-south axis of the Garden. It was placed on a high pedestal. This location was not one of obscurity, but of prominence.

In 1702, after the transformation from Louis XIV to Marcus Curtius, the Roman hero, the statue was moved to the end of the Lake of the Swiss Guards at the opposite end of the palace grounds from the Basin of Neptune. The Statue was positioned near the pool, which symbolizes the abyss that Marcus Curtius throws himself into. Rather than being immediately rejected, the statue was actually placed in several areas of prominence over a 16-year period.

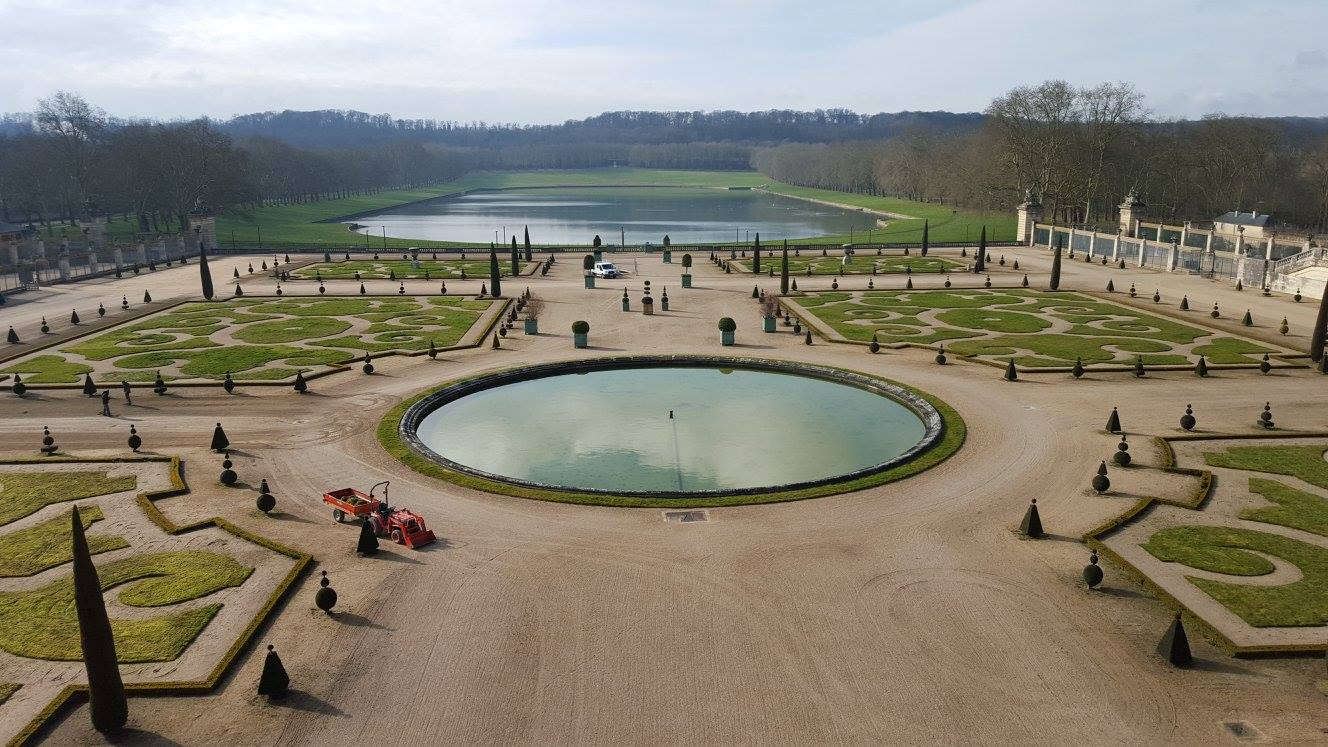
Orangerie at Versailles with the Lake of the Swiss Guards. Bernini's sculpture was placed at the very far end of the lake.

In spite of Louis's public rejection of the equestrian statue, its form inspired future royal portraits of the King, including a marble creation by Antoine Coysevox depicting Louis XIV on horseback which sits in the Salon of War at Versailles, making corrections to facial characteristics created by Bernini which the French king interpreted as a slight against him, creating a more somber expression and raising the forehead to a more 'suitable' height.

=== After Bernini's visit ===
Following the failure of Bernini's stay in Paris, French attitudes toward Italian culture changed, a shift in attitude that for the first time since the Renaissance recognized that a national self-consciousness and self confidence north of the Alps had developed, an attitude that developed as a result of the rejection of the Italian Baroque and the popularization of French classicism, resulting in Bernini's redesign of the Louvre Palace never rising above its foundations.

== Culmination of themes in Bernini's work ==
=== The Vision of Constantine ===
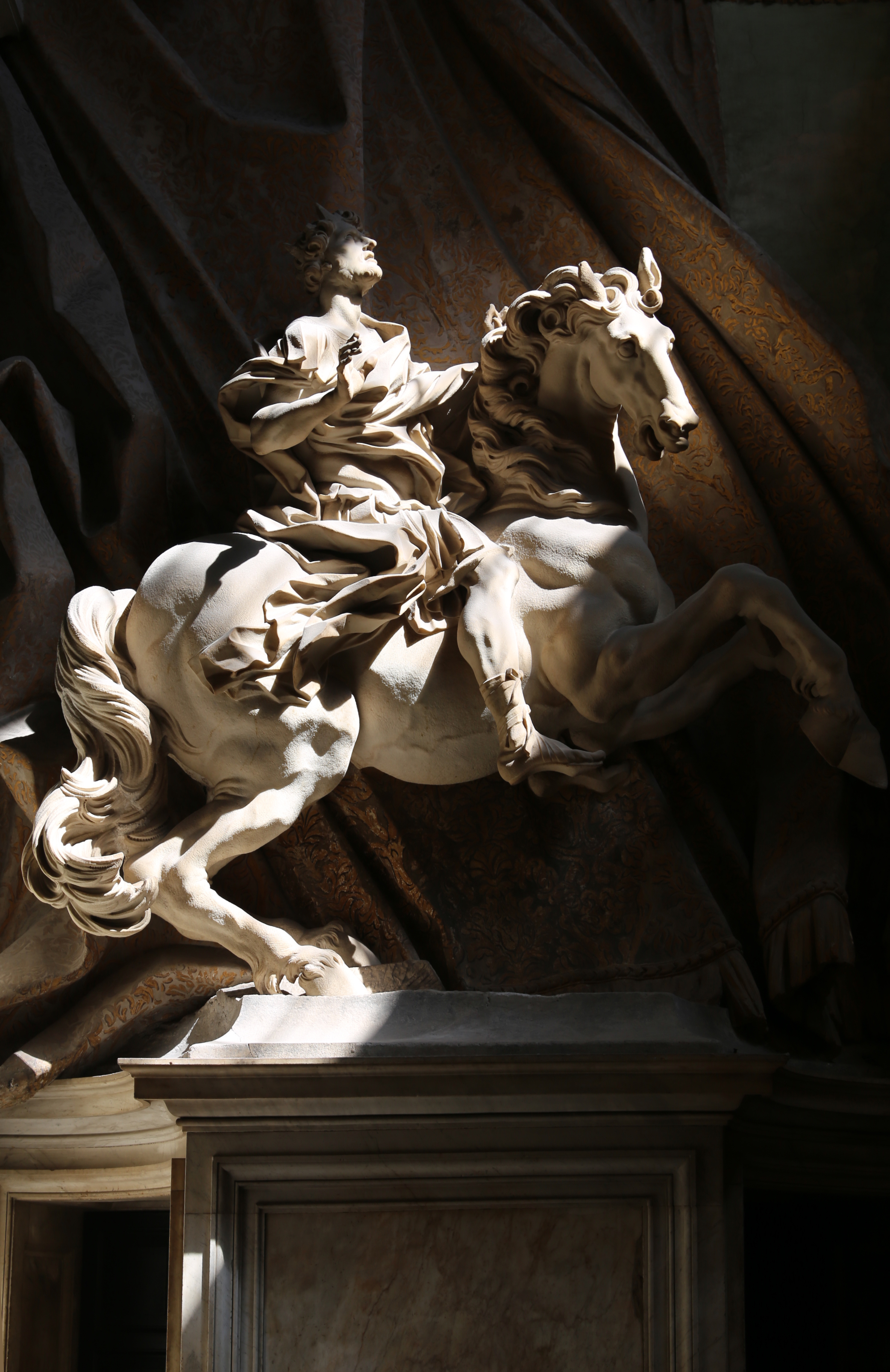
Gian Lorenzo Bernini, Costantino, 1670, 02

In his process to construct the equestrian statue, Bernini referred back to one of his earlier works, the Vision of the Emperor Constantine, which began construction in 1654 and was completed in late 1669.

The equestrian statue of Louis XIV was designed with his earlier work in Rome on The Vision of Constantine in mind, with both horses striking similar poses and neither riders holding reins or stirrups. Whereas Constantine's gestures were raised above him to convey the vision of the Holy Cross and God above him, the Sun King’s gestures are grounded to convey his mundane and non-divine power in an act that Bernini termed as an ‘act of majesty and command'.

Unlike the statue of Constantine the Great, the statue of Louis XIV had been carved from a single block of stone, to be 'the largest ever seen in Rome," according to early biographers.

== Later changes ==
=== Recutting ===
In 1687, Francois Girardon was tasked with amending Bernini's sculpture. When recut by François Girardon the equestrian statue was re-purposed to depict Marcus Curtius, an ancient Roman hero. In his story, an abyss appeared in the middle of the Roman Forum that only the sacrifice of Rome's greatest possession would close. As a result Curtius determined that Rome's most prized possession was the bravery of its soldiers and hurled himself into the abyss while riding his horse, closing it.

Girardon, the director of the Académie royale de peinture et de sculpture, and the governor of all royal commissions of sculpture, carved the head and the horse’s support, adding a helmet and flames while changing the face. This narrative was viewed as better fitting the contortions of the horse, which did not depict a high level of horsemanship. Bernini had opted for movement instead of poise which was not well received by Louis XIV

Two major elements were changed; the flowing hair at the back of Louis XIV’s head was converted into the casque of a crested helmet and the flags were converted into a mass of flames at the horse’s feet.

== See also ==
- Bust of Louis XIV (Bernini)
- List of works by Gian Lorenzo Bernini
