= Versailles Orangerie =

Orchard at Versailles, France

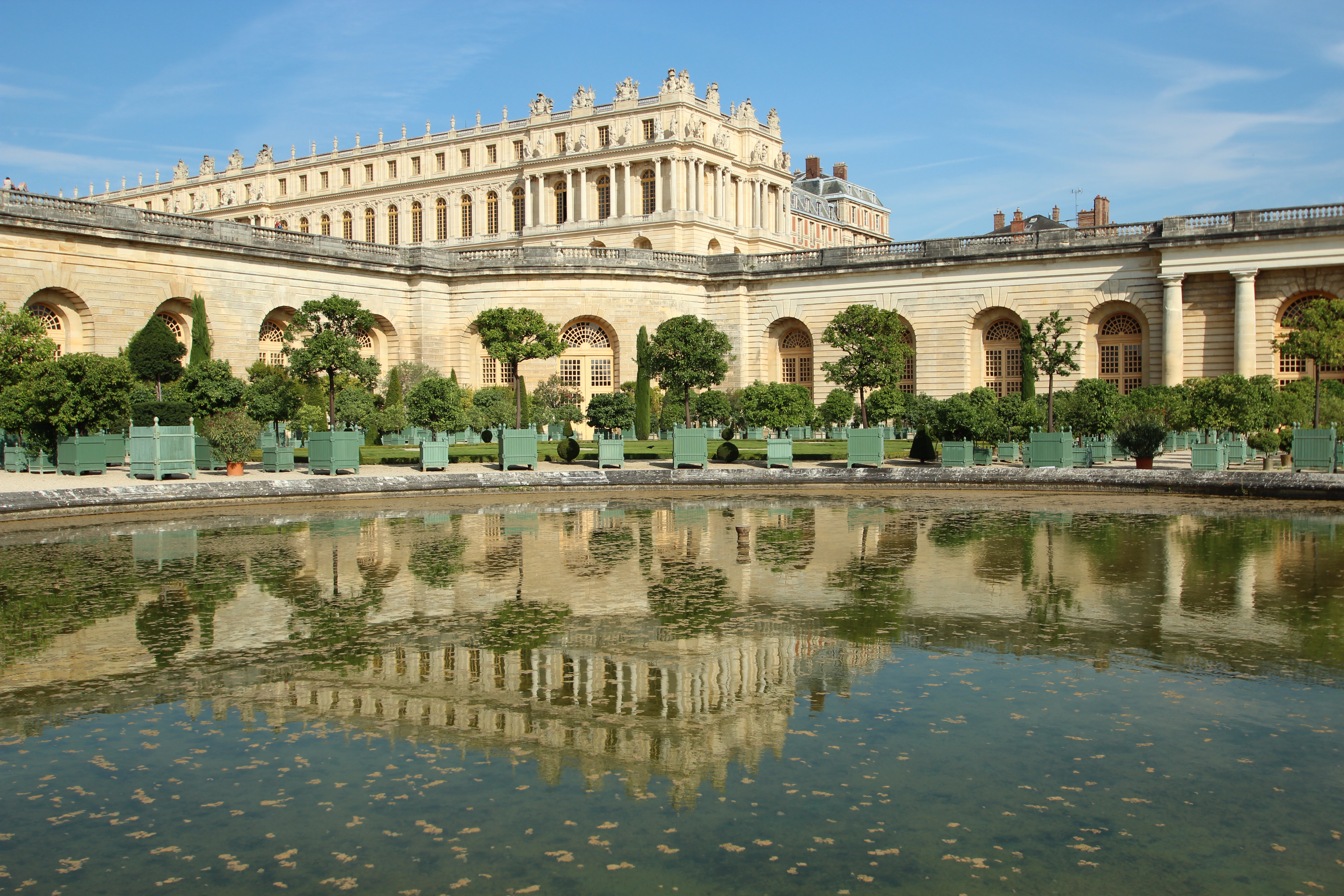
Versailles Orangerie

The Versailles Orangerie (French: L'orangerie du château de Versailles) was built by Jules Hardouin-Mansart between 1684 and 1686, before work on the Château de Versailles had even begun. The Orangerie, which replaced Louis Le Vau's earlier design from 1663, is an example of many such prestigious extensions of grand gardens in Europe designed both to shelter tender plants and impress visitors. With the addition of the Orangerie, the gardens, no longer reserved solely for use by Louis XIV, had the added use of a theatrical setting that could be used to entertain guests at court.

In the winter, the Versailles Orangerie houses more than a thousand trees in boxes. In previous centuries, in winter, the trees were housed in a cathedral-like space, and during the coldest months, the gardeners would burn fires to heat the housing of the trees. In 1689 gardener Valentin Lopin created a device to transport and move the large orange trees.

Most of the trees are citrus trees originally shipped from Italy, but there are many tender Mediterranean plants including oleanders, olive, pomegranate, and palm trees, totaling over 1,055 altogether. From May to October, they are put outdoors in the "Parterre Bas".

== Late medieval and early Renaissance popularity of oranges ==
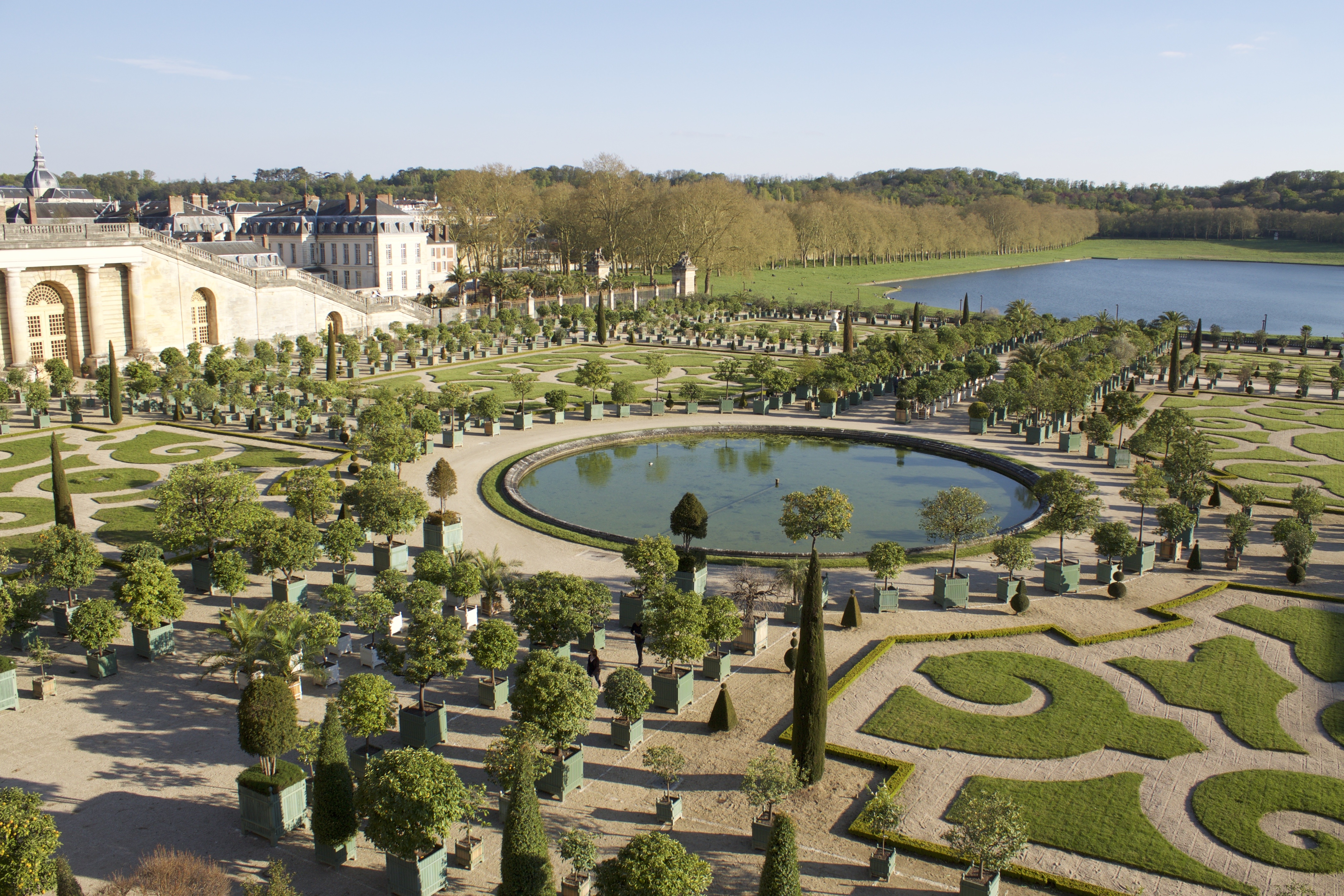
Parc de Versailles, with the orange trees in boxes

The bitter orange (Citrus × aurantium) was introduced to Europe by the 15th or 16th century. At first, bitter oranges were an expensive food item, with some medieval cookbooks detailing exactly how many orange slices a visiting dignitary was entitled to. Citrus soon became the fashion of the nobility and rich merchants.

By the 15th century, sweet oranges (Citrus × sinensis) had become well-established and had assumed commercial importance in Europe.

In France, the first orangery was built and stocked by Charles VIII at the Château d'Amboise. There is general agreement that the arrival of the sweet orange in Europe was linked with the activities of the Portuguese during the 15th century, and particularly by Vasco de Gama's voyages to the East. Although the Romans had been acquainted with lemons and oranges as well as different types of citrus fruits, oranges (bitter and sweet) and lemons reached Europe centuries apart.

By withholding water and nutrients, and by using pruning techniques, French gardeners were able to make citrus trees bloom throughout the year, to the delight of Louis XIV. Citrus motifs formed themes in sculpture, mosaics, embroidery, weaving, paintings, poems, and songs throughout history, and orange blossoms remain prized as floral ornaments at weddings. However, during a trip to Versailles, John Locke wrote about the appearance of the trees, stating that the boxes the trees were planted in did not enable proper rooting, causing the trees to develop a unique shape with small heads and thick trunks.

== Description ==
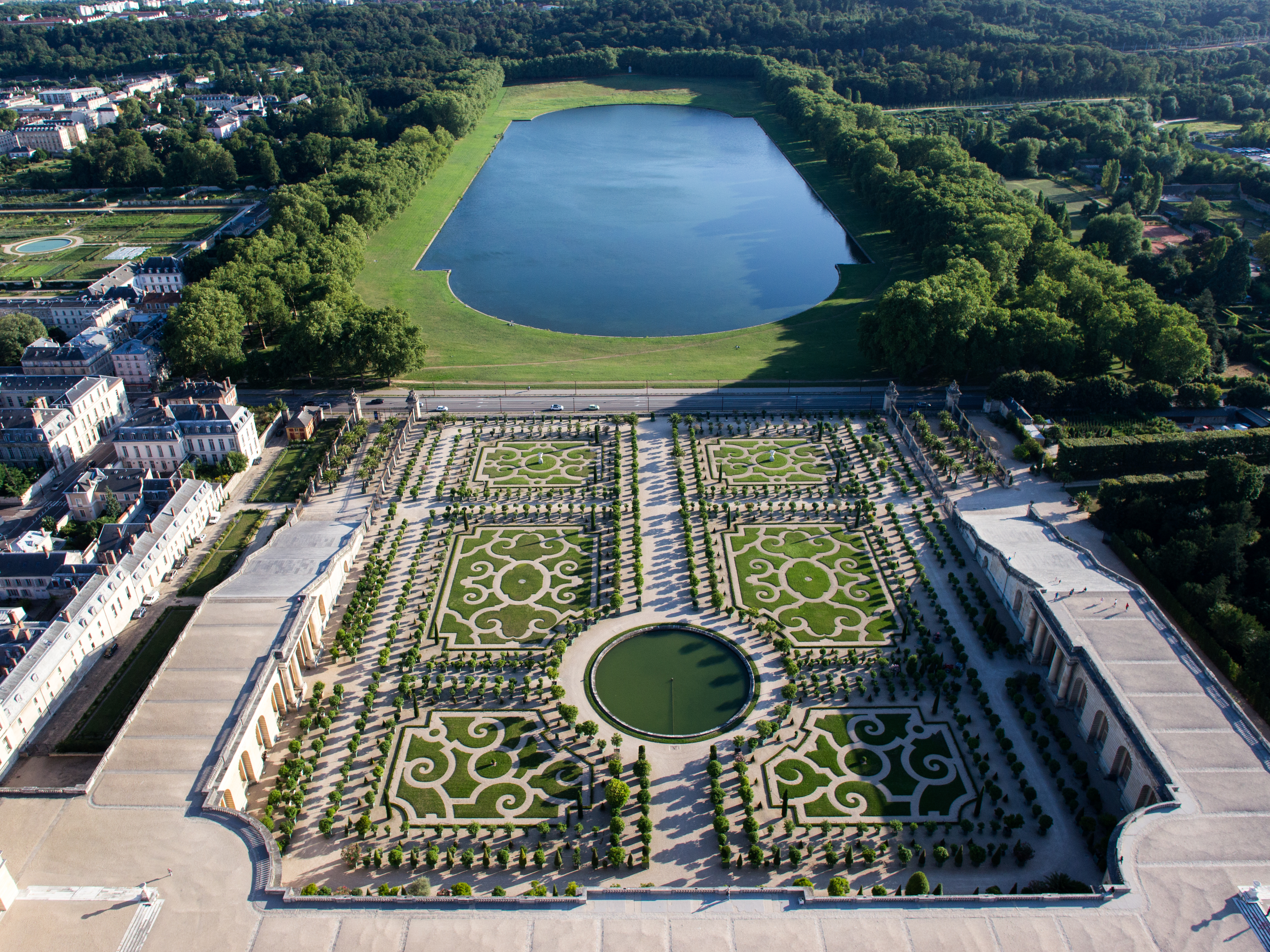
Escaliers des Cent Marches

The central gallery is flanked by two side galleries located under the "Escaliers des Cent Marches" (so-called because each staircase has 100 steps). The three galleries enclose the lower bed (Parterre Bas), also called "Parterre de l'orangerie". The walls of these galleries are 4–5 metres (13–16 ft) thick and the central gallery is over 150 metres (490 ft) long and 13 metres (43 ft) high. The central gallery faces south to optimize the natural warming effects of the sun, which, combined with the double glazing of the windows, provides a frost-free environment without the use of artificial heating year-round.

At the center of the Parterre Bas is a large circular pool with a jet d'eau water feature, surrounded by formal lawns planted with topiary. From May to October, the orange trees and other trees are exposed in the lower bed. There are over 1,000 different containers altogether, with several pomegranate (Punica granatum), olive (Olea europaea), and orange (Citrus × sinensis) trees that are over 200 years old.

=== Sculpture ===
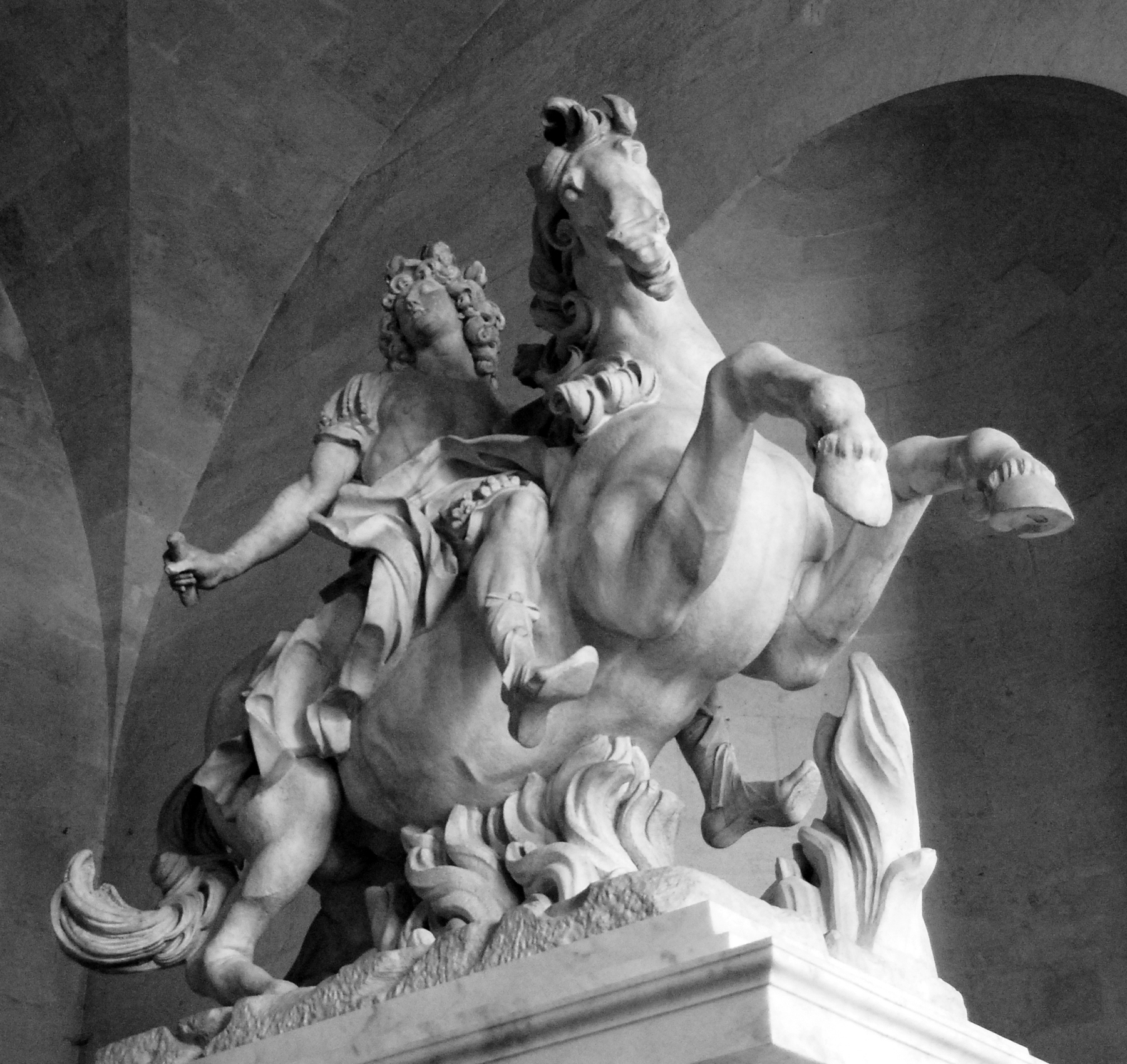
Equestrian statue of Louis XIV (Bernini)

The Orangerie shelters an assortment of statuary, the most famous of which is an equestrian statue of Louis XIV by Gian Lorenzo Bernini, the most prominent sculptor of the Baroque period. Louis XIV was famously displeased with the likeness of Bernini's statue of him, ordering its destruction when he first saw it in 1685. Louis was a skilled horseman and felt the sculpture's pose and drama was generally wild and inconsistent with his royal dignity. He was persuaded to move the statue to a remote location in the gardens, on the north side of the Neptune Basin rather than destroy it, but he did call in his preferred sculptor François Girardon to re-shape the face and the base of the statue. Recast as a representation of the ancient Roman hero Marcus Curtius, it was moved to the north side of the Pièce d'eau des Suisses, opposite the boundary of the Orangerie parterre, where it remained for centuries.

In another part of the Orangerie lies the octagon bath of Rouge de Rance marble which once belonged to Louis XIV. It was originally installed in a lavish five-room bathing complex belonging to the King's mistress, Madame de Montespan.

The Orangerie was home to many Bronze replicas of Classical sculpture. Symmetry and antithesis dominated the gardens and Orangerie. In 1701 a bronze Hercules was placed in the Orangerie at Versailles and the themes of the piece reflected those of Louis XIV's rule. Other Italian Renisances pieces in the gardens included copies of Bacchus and Diana.

== Under Louis XIV ==
Originally completed in 1663, the Orangerie was intended to supply the much smaller hunting lodge of Versailles and the small retinue which Louis XIV would bring with him in the summer. In 1678, an enlargement of the Orangerie was begun by Jules Hardouin-Mansart, which doubled the size of the original. Completed in 1688, the masonry pavilions of the new Orangerie were modelled on the theories of the horticulturalist Jean-Baptiste de La Quintinie, the master gardener of the Potager du roi, whose writings detailed a system for protecting exotic plants from the cold without the use of artificial heating.

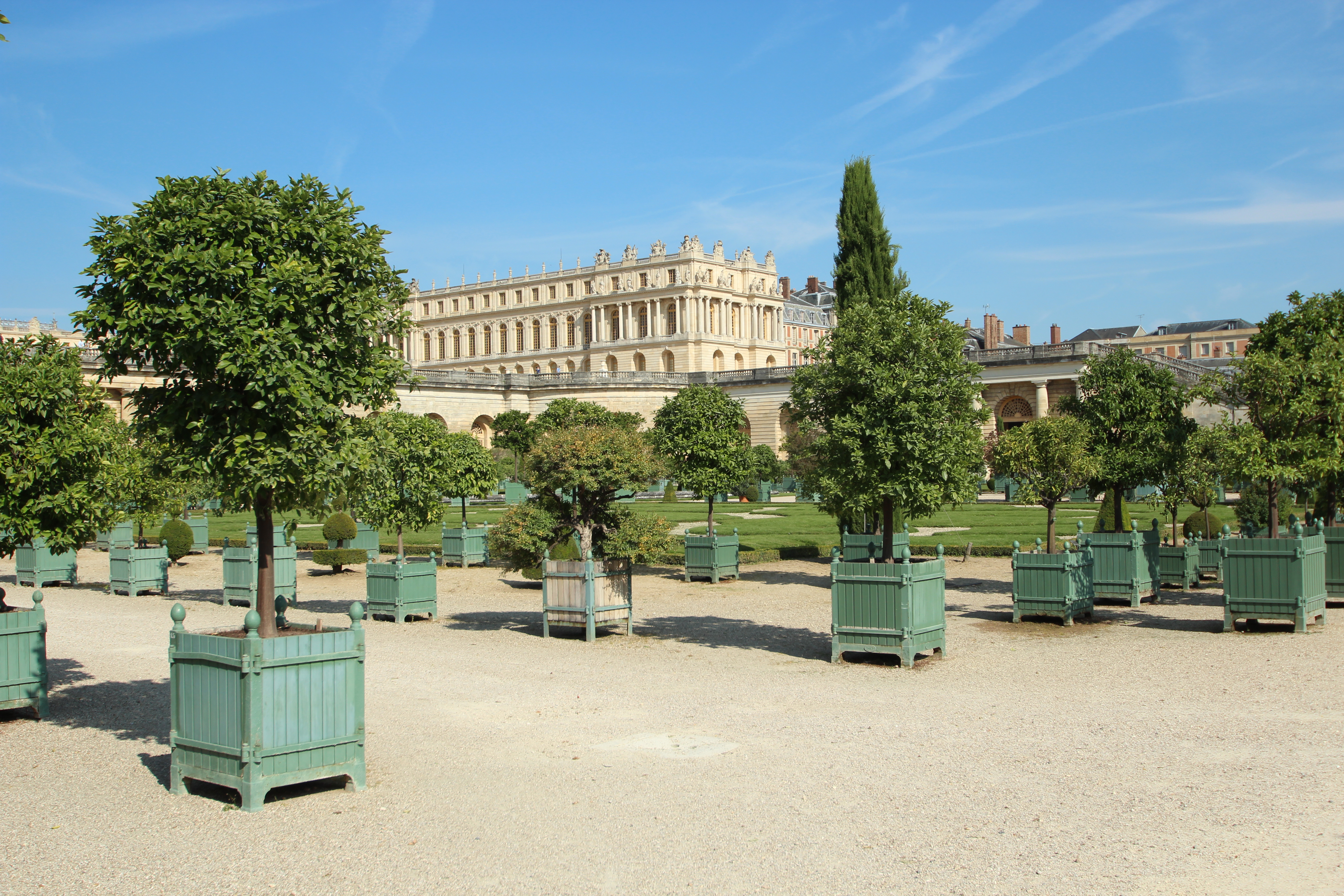
Potted trees

As Louis XIV grew older he became allergic to flowers and preferred the smell of the citrus trees, developing a love for orange trees. He had them potted in solid silver tubs and placed throughout the state rooms of the Palace to perfume the air. The Orangerie was intended to supply the palace with specimens and supply the Court with fruit year-round. In 1664, a year after the first Orangerie was completed, Louis XIV disgraced his former Finance Minister Nicolas Fouquet, who was convicted of maladministration. Fouquet suffered the confiscation of his property to the Crown, including over 1,000 orange trees from Vaux-le-Vicomte which were transferred to the Orangerie.

Numbering several thousand trees by the 1790s, the Orangerie was the largest of its kind in Europe and a major attraction for visiting diplomats and foreign royalty. In 1698 the British Ambassador to France, William Bentinck, 1st Earl of Portland, reported back to King William III that he had been taken to view the orange trees at Versailles, but compared them unfavorably to William's own collections in Holland.

== Location in the garden ==
The Versailles Orangerie is under the flowerbed known as "Parterre du Midi". Its central gallery is 155 m (509 ft) in length, and its frontage is directed towards the south. The Parterre Bas is bordered on its south side by a balustrade overlooking the Saint-Cyr-l'École. This separates it from the "Swiss Pond".

== Gallery ==
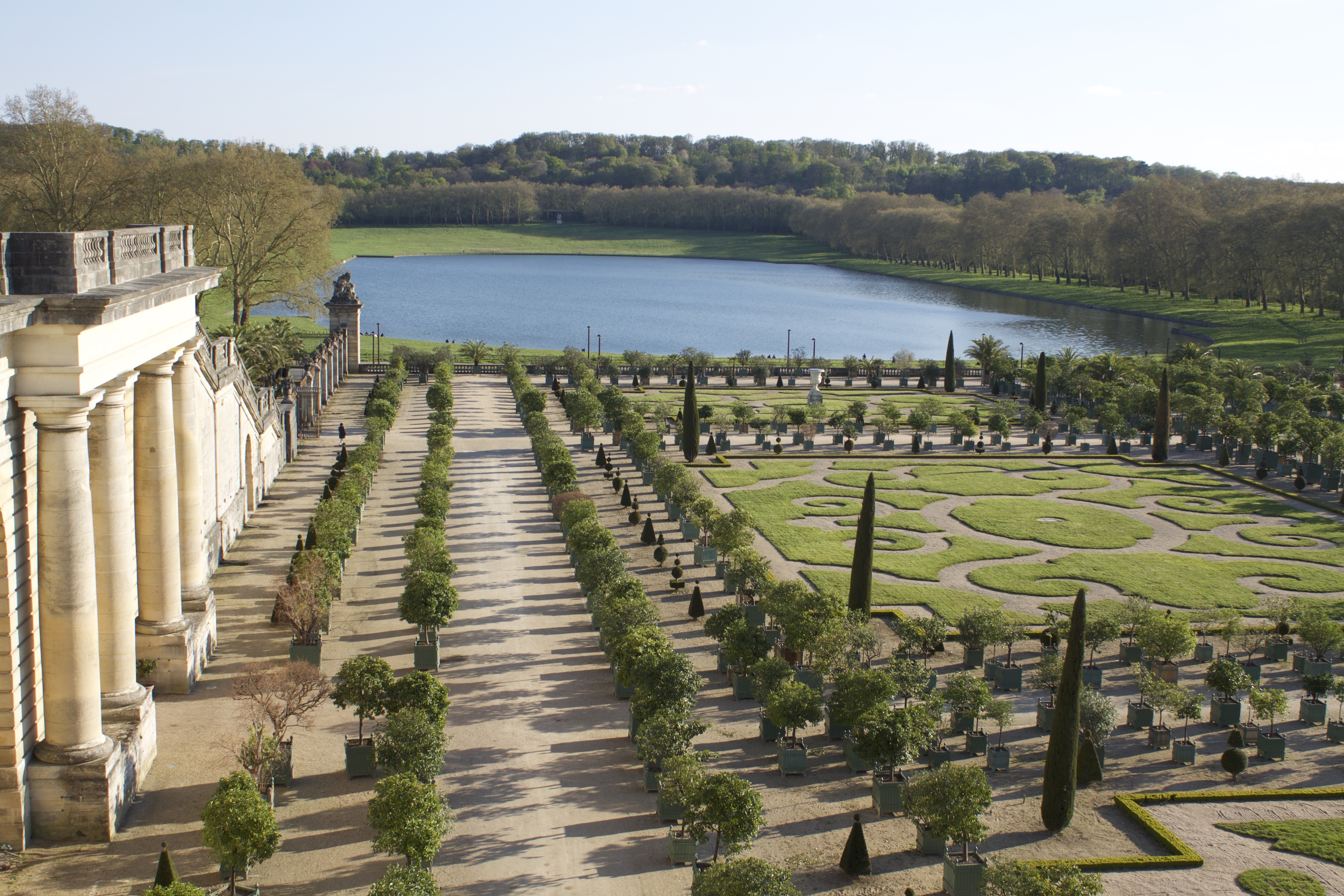
View of the Swiss Pond from the Orangerie

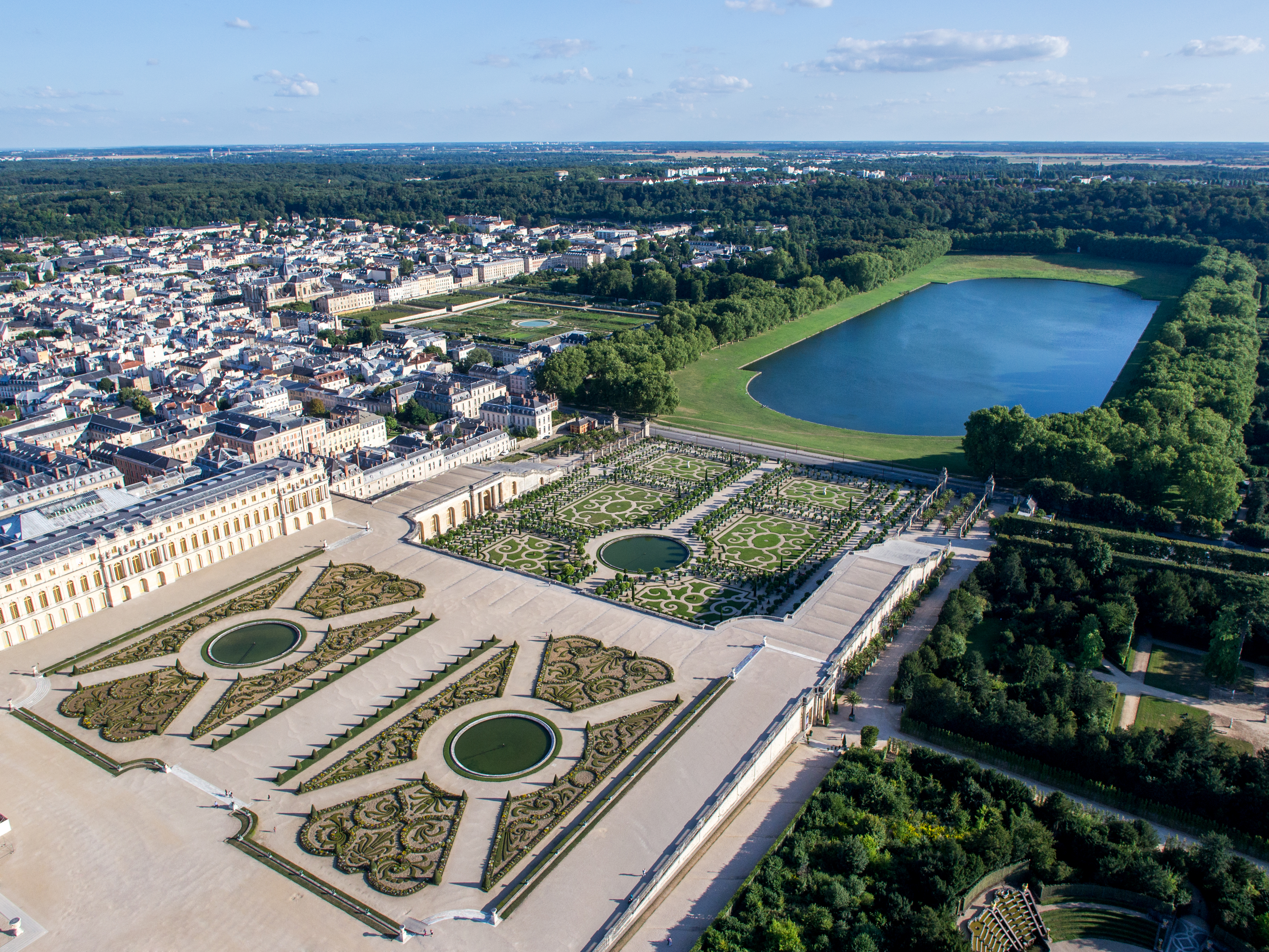
Aerial view of Parterre du Midi, Parterre de l'orangerie, and the Swiss Pond

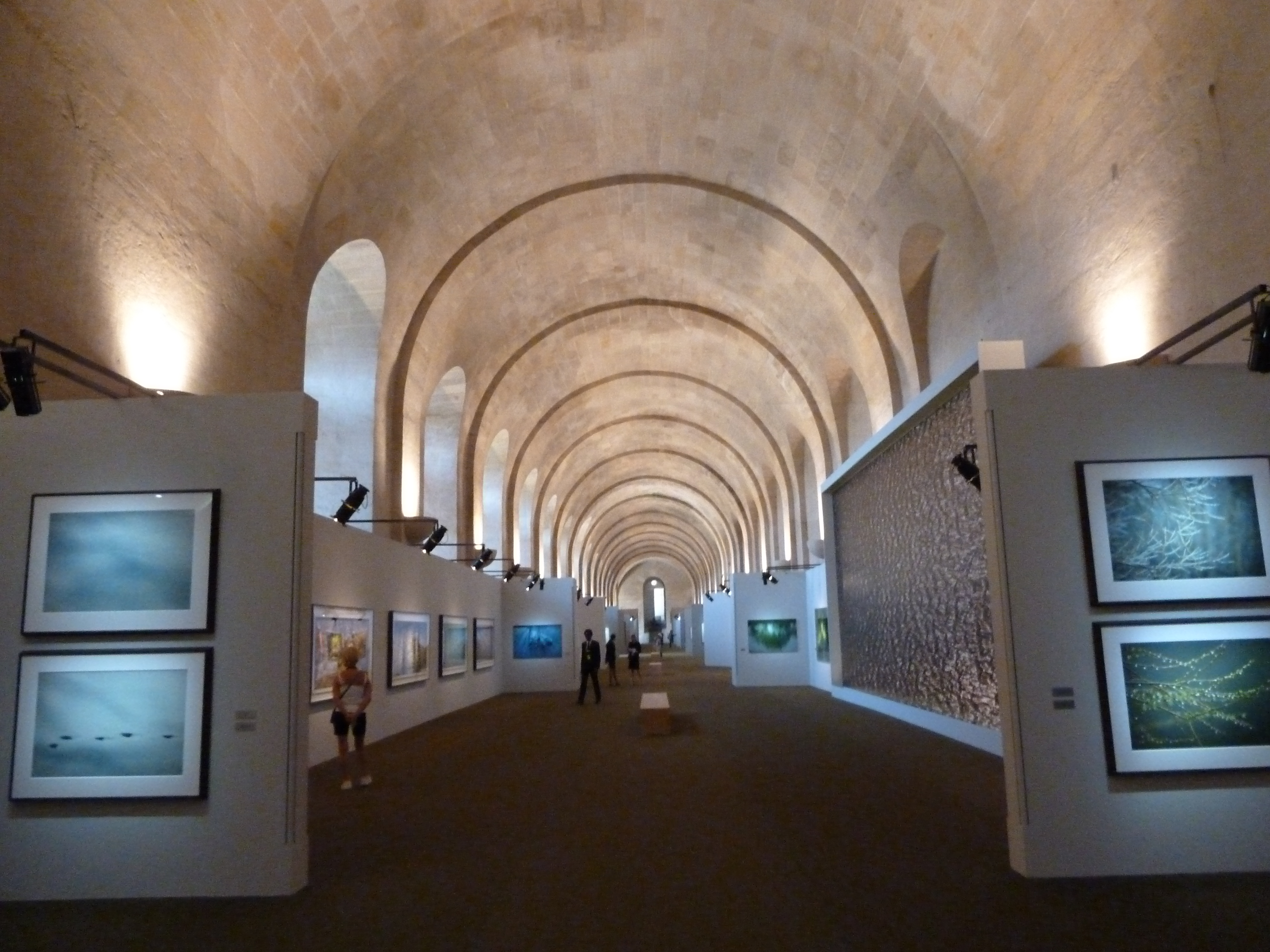
Interior of Versailles Orangerie: the central gallery

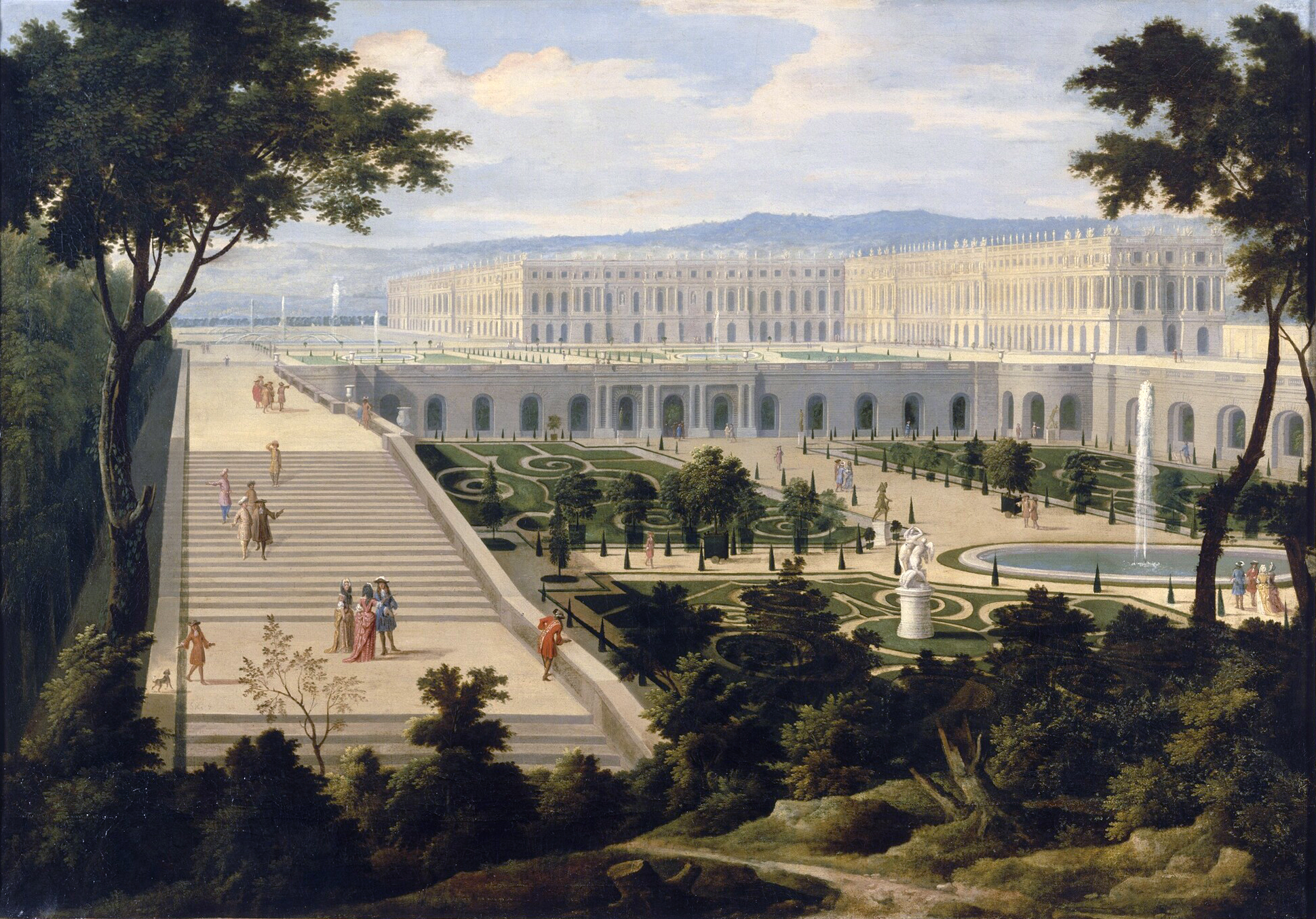
View of the Orangerie in 1695 as painted by Étienne Allegrain and Jean-Baptiste Martin

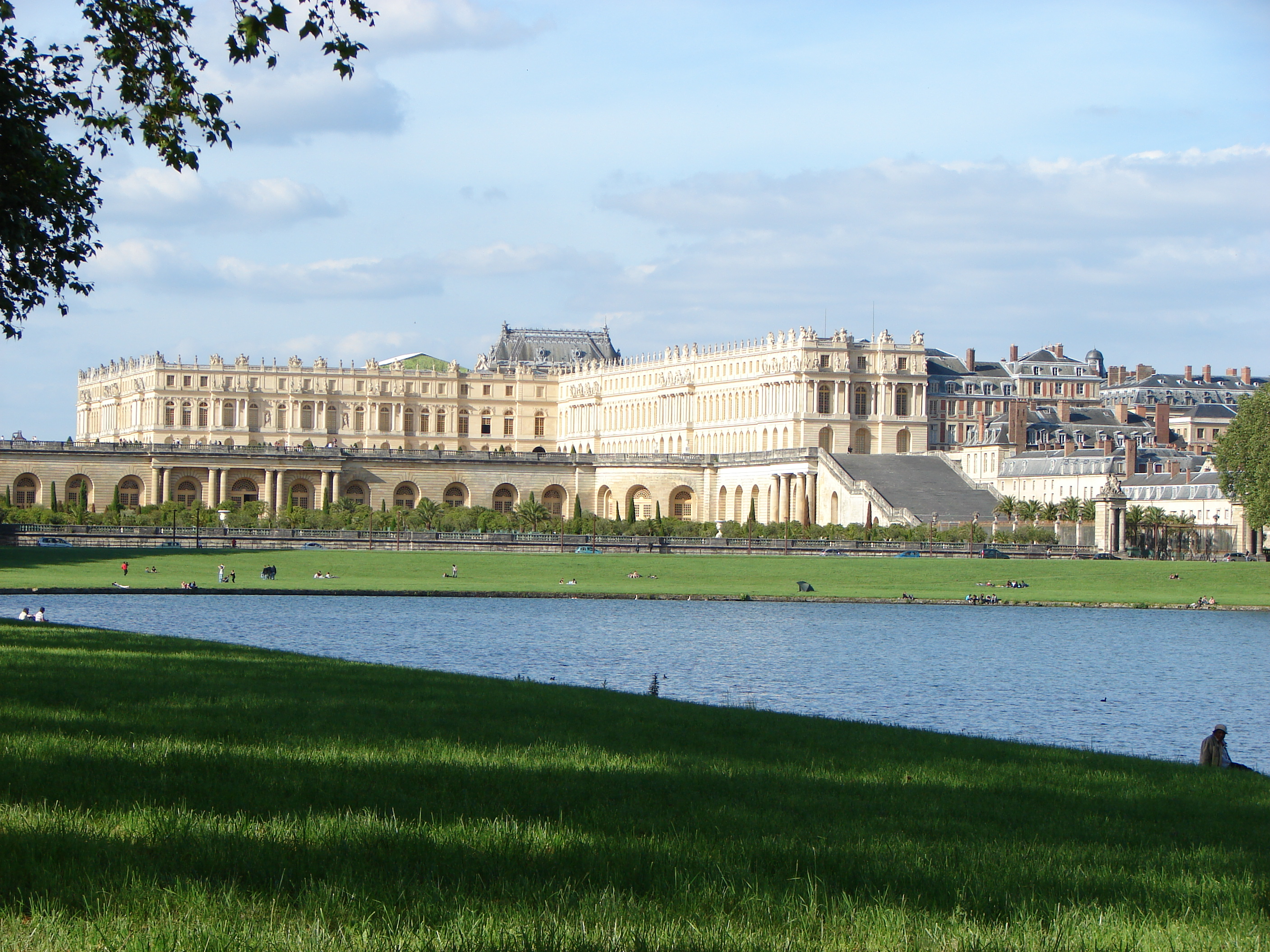
Remote view across the Swiss Pond
