= Stylianos Stavrakis =

Greek painter

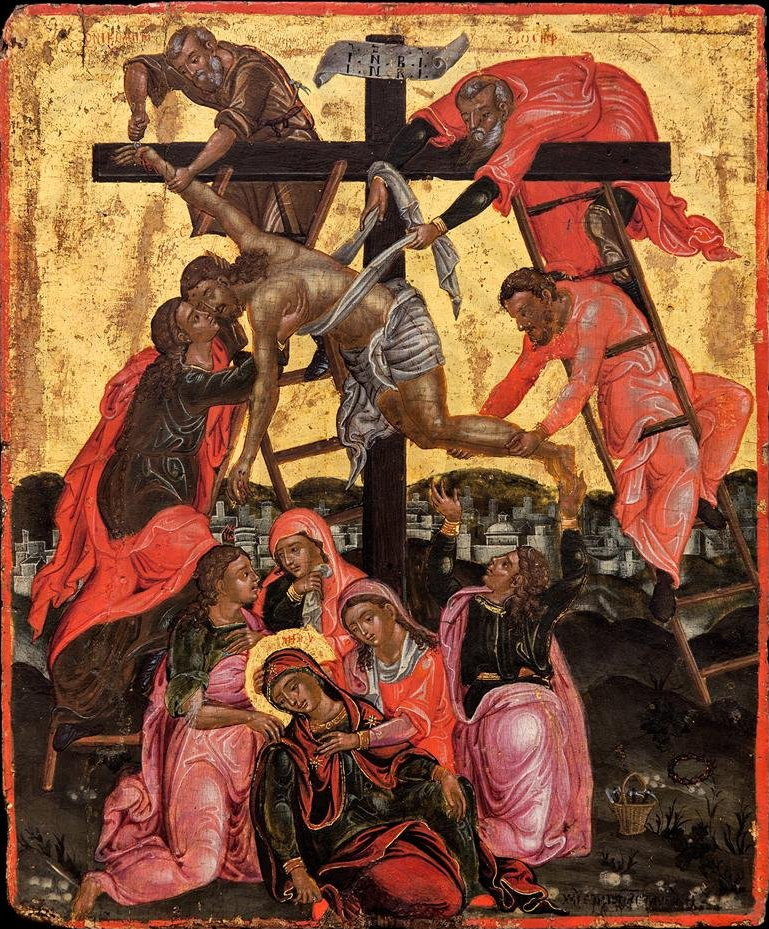
- Descent from the Cross
- Born: 1709-1714; Zakynthos, Republic of Venice
- Died: 1786; Zakynthos, Republic of Venice
- Known for: Painter and Goldsmith
- Movement: Heptanese School (painting); Greek Rococo; Neoclassicism

Stylianos Stavrakis (Greek: Στυλιανός Σταυράκης, 1709/1714 – 1786), was a Greek painter during the Neo-Hellenic Enlightenment era in art. He was a goldsmith and painter. He was very active on the Ionian Islands. Nikolaos Koutouzis, Nikolaos Doxaras and Nikolaos Kallergis were all active in Zakynthos during the same period. He is a prominent member of the coveted Heptanese painting style. He comes from a family of painters. His brother Andreas Stavrakis and nephew Demetrios Stavrakis were both famous painters. He influenced countless artists. Konstantinos Kontarinis and other artists of the Ionian Islands began to emulate his work. His most notable work is The Deposition from the Cross (Stavrakis). Fourteen of his paintings survived. Most of them can be found in Zakynthos, Greece.

== History ==
Stavrakis was born in Zakynthos. He was a priest. His father's name was Emmanuel and his mother was Catherine Theodosi. His brother Andreas Stavrakis was also a famous painter, he died around 1785. His nephew Demetrios Stavrakis was also a famous painter. In 1756, records indicate Stylianos agreed to decorate parts of the church Agios Spyridon of Flampouriari, with gold trim. Records exist from 1734 to 1786. He died one year after his brother.

The Stavrakis family heavily influenced Greek art into the 19th century. The family's painting style resembles Panagiotis Doxaras and other contemporary artists of the Heptanese School. The school refined the style of Cretan art which was derived from Byzantine painting. One of his signatures was χιρ Στυλιανού ιερέος του Σταυράκη .

== Gallery ==
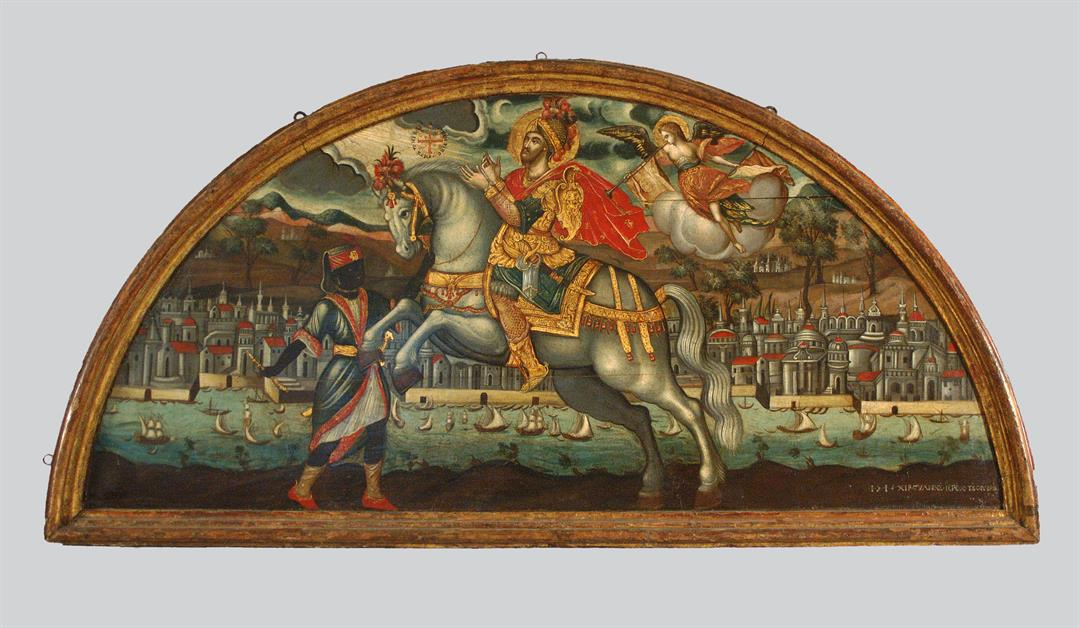
Vision of Constantine (Stavarkis)

== Bibliography ==
- Hatzidakis, Manolis (1987). Greek painters after the fall (1450-1830) Volume A. Athens, GR: Center for Modern Greek Studies E.I.E.
- Hatzidakis, Manolis & Drakopoulou, Eugenia (1997). Greek painters after the fall (1450-1830) Volume B. Athens, GR: Center for Modern Greek Studies E.I.E.
- Drakopoulou, Eugenia (2010). Greek painters after the fall (1450-1830) Volume C. Athens, GR: Center for Modern Greek Studies E.I.E.
