= Ioannis Apakas =

Greek painter and priest

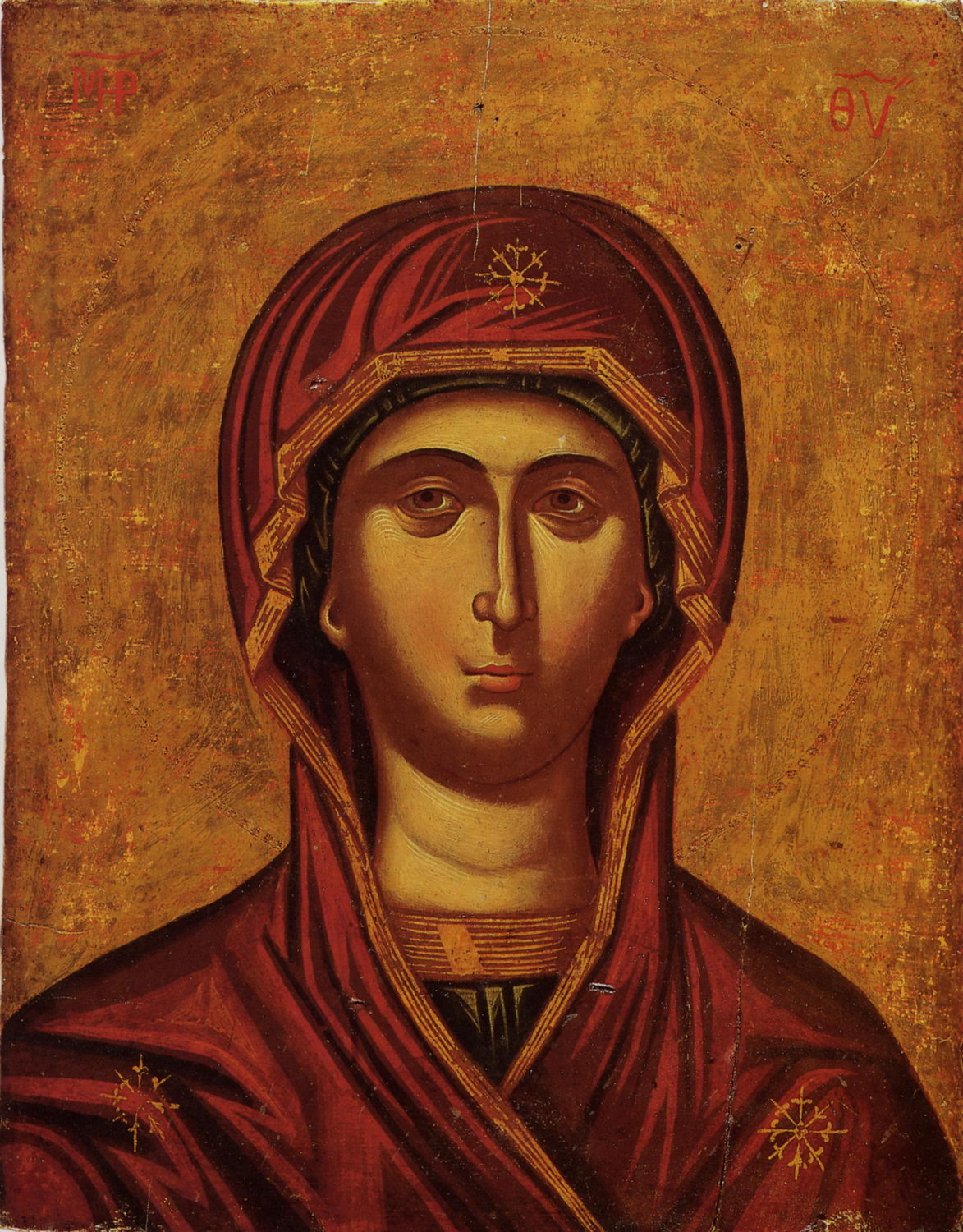
- Virgin Mary
- Born: mid 1500s Heraklion, Republic of Venice
- Died: early 1600s
- Movement: Cretan school

Ιoannis Apakas (Greek: Ιωάννης Απακάς; mid 1500s – early 1600s), also known as Johann Apakass, was a Greek painter and priest, active in the later 16th and early 17th centuries. The Italo-Byzantine style of his first paintings evolved under the influence of more refined works by Cretan school and Venetian artists. In his maturity, Apakas showed stylistic affinities with Michael Damaskinos, Georgios Klontzas, Victor of Crete and Leos and Elias Moskos.

Apakas was a popular artist in his day. Ten of his paintings have survived, and are featured in public foundations, private collections, churches and monasteries, mostly in Greece. His most notable work is Ignatius of Antioch, whose lions were emulated by many subsequent Cretan School artists.

== History ==
Apakas was born in Heraklion in the Republic of Venice. He was a priest and a painter. Not much is known about his life. He continued painting. Artists resembling his work were Philotheos Skoufos, Elias Moskos. A large amount of his art still exists today. He signed most of his work Χειρ ιερέως Ιωάννου. He is one of the forerunners of the Heptanese school. His works are in the same category as Michael Damaskinos and Theodore Poulakis. He began to refine the traditional maniera greca of the Cretan school leading the art movement into the Heptanese school. Many of his paintings are located in Greece. He also painted the Last Judgement. A theme that was painted by Georgios Klontzas and Leos Moskos. Another common theme between Apakas, Theodore Poulakis and Elias Moskos was the Tree of Jesse. with Jesus or the Virgin

== Gallery ==
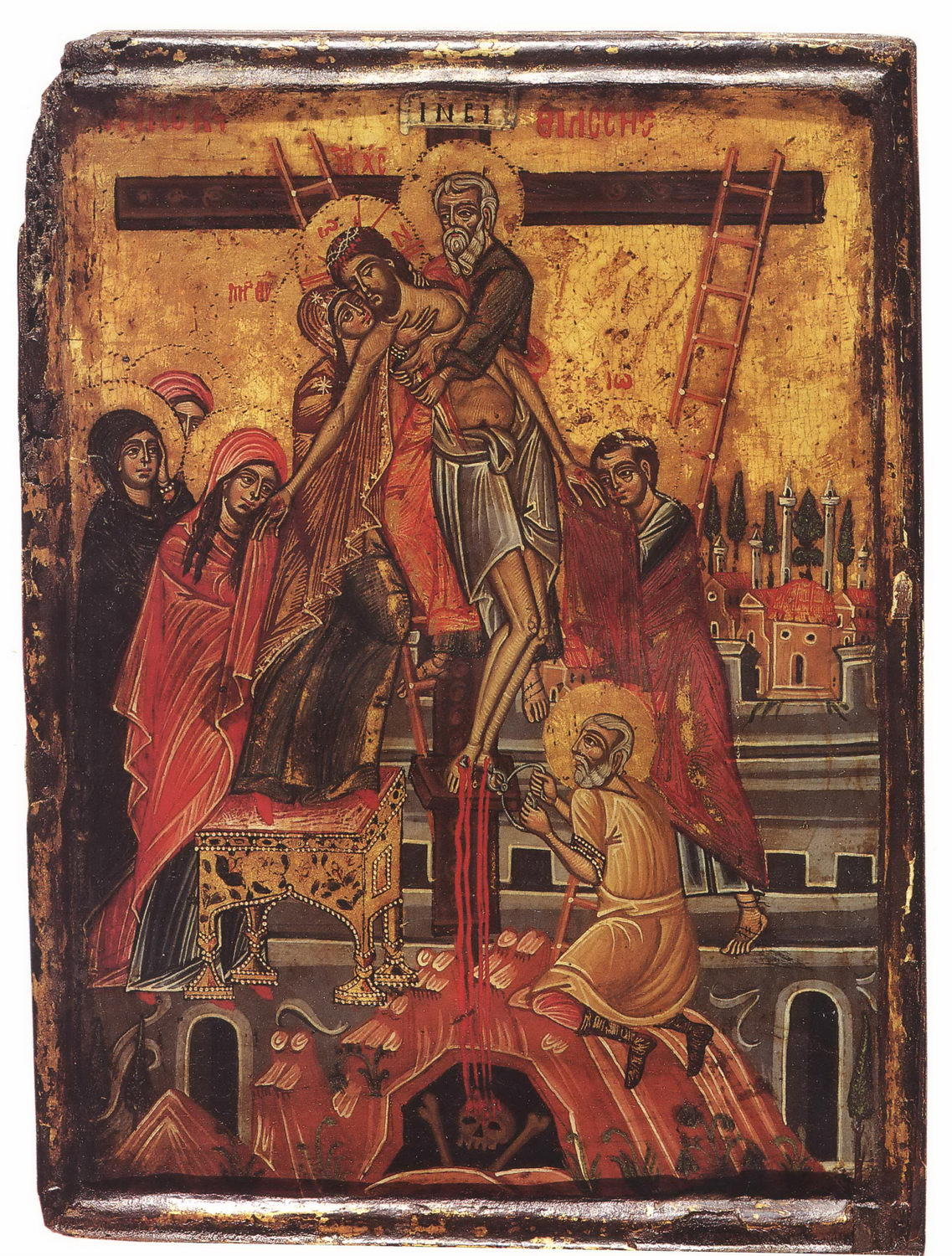
Descent from the Cross

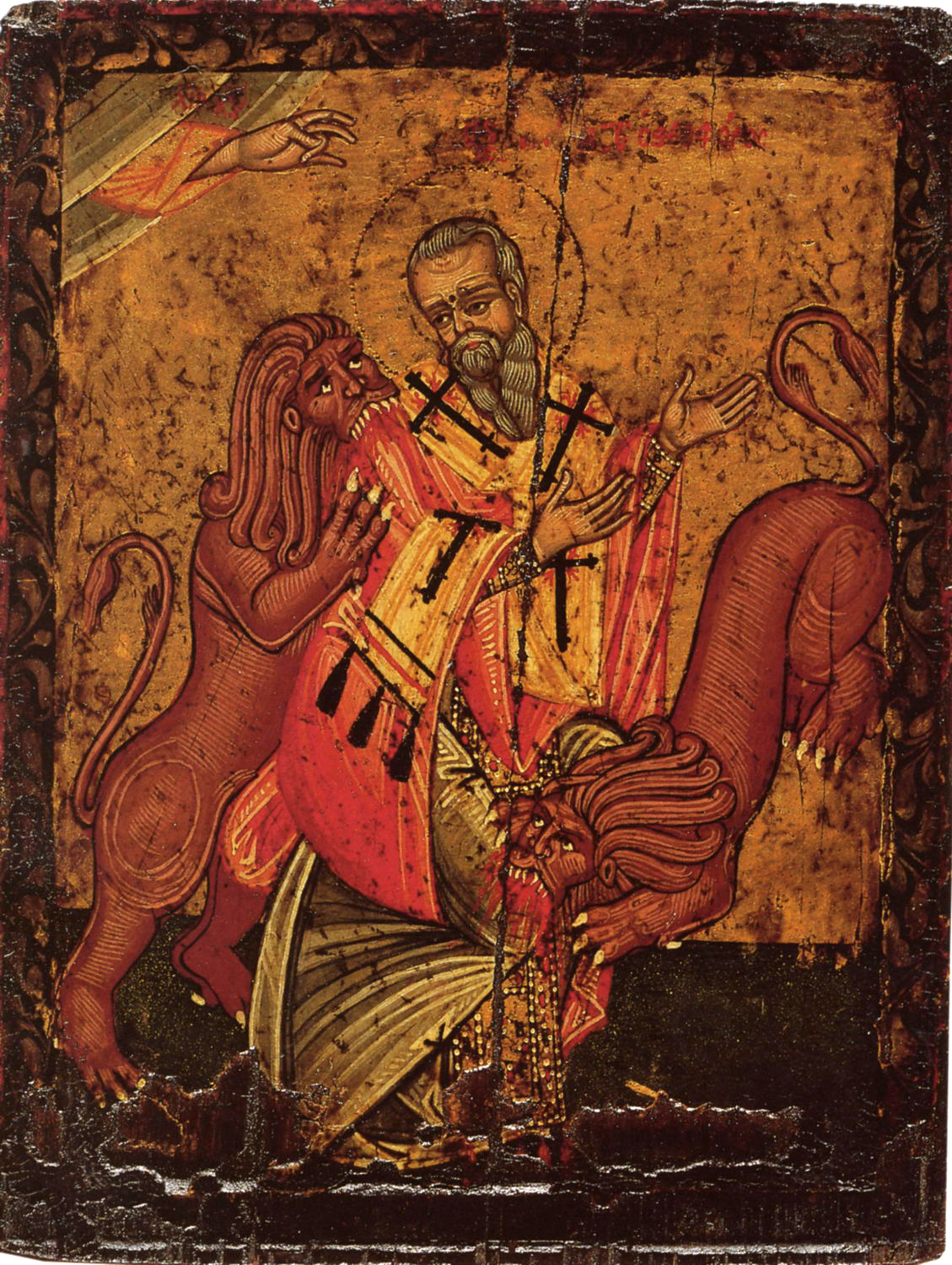
Ignatius of Antioch

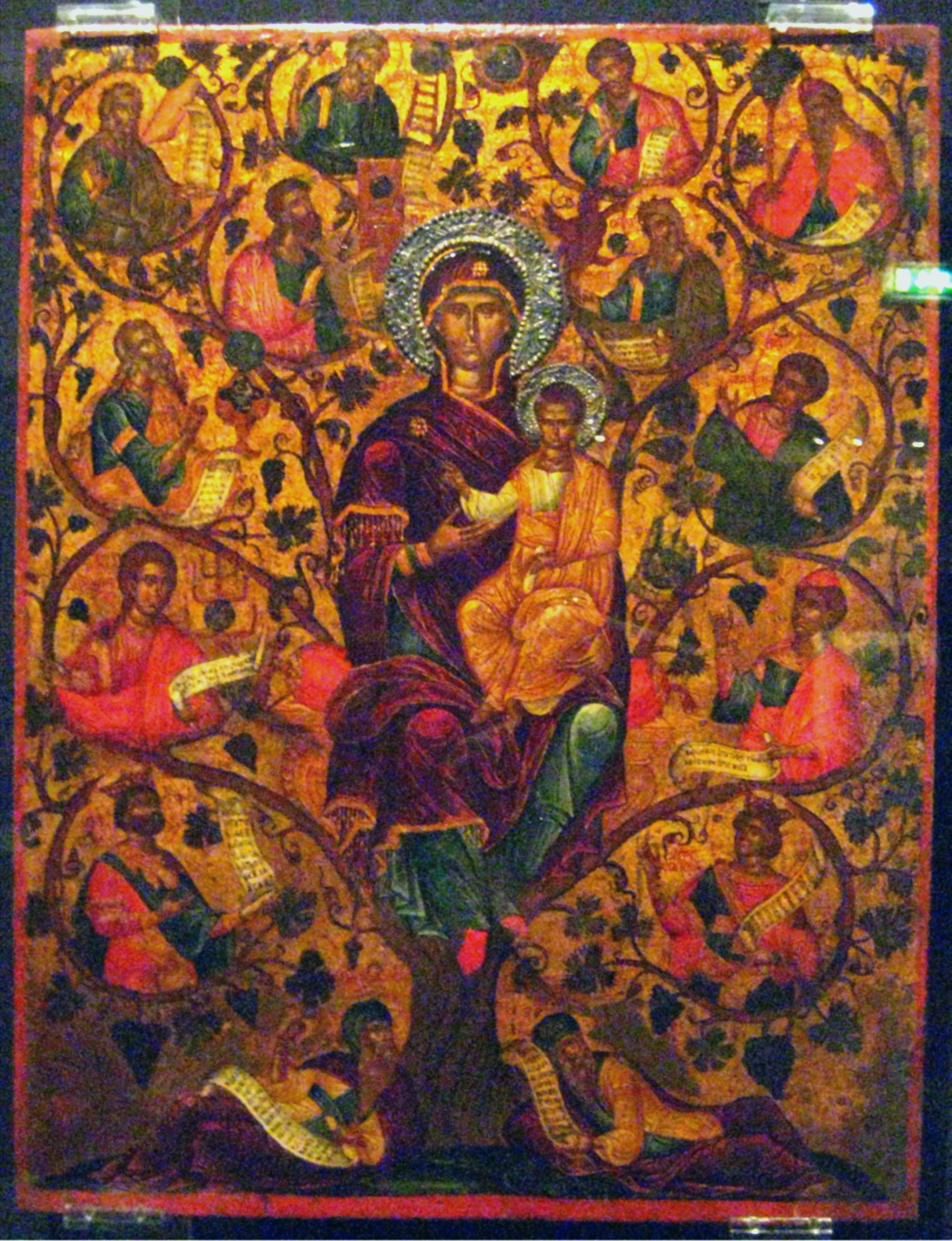
Tree of Jesse

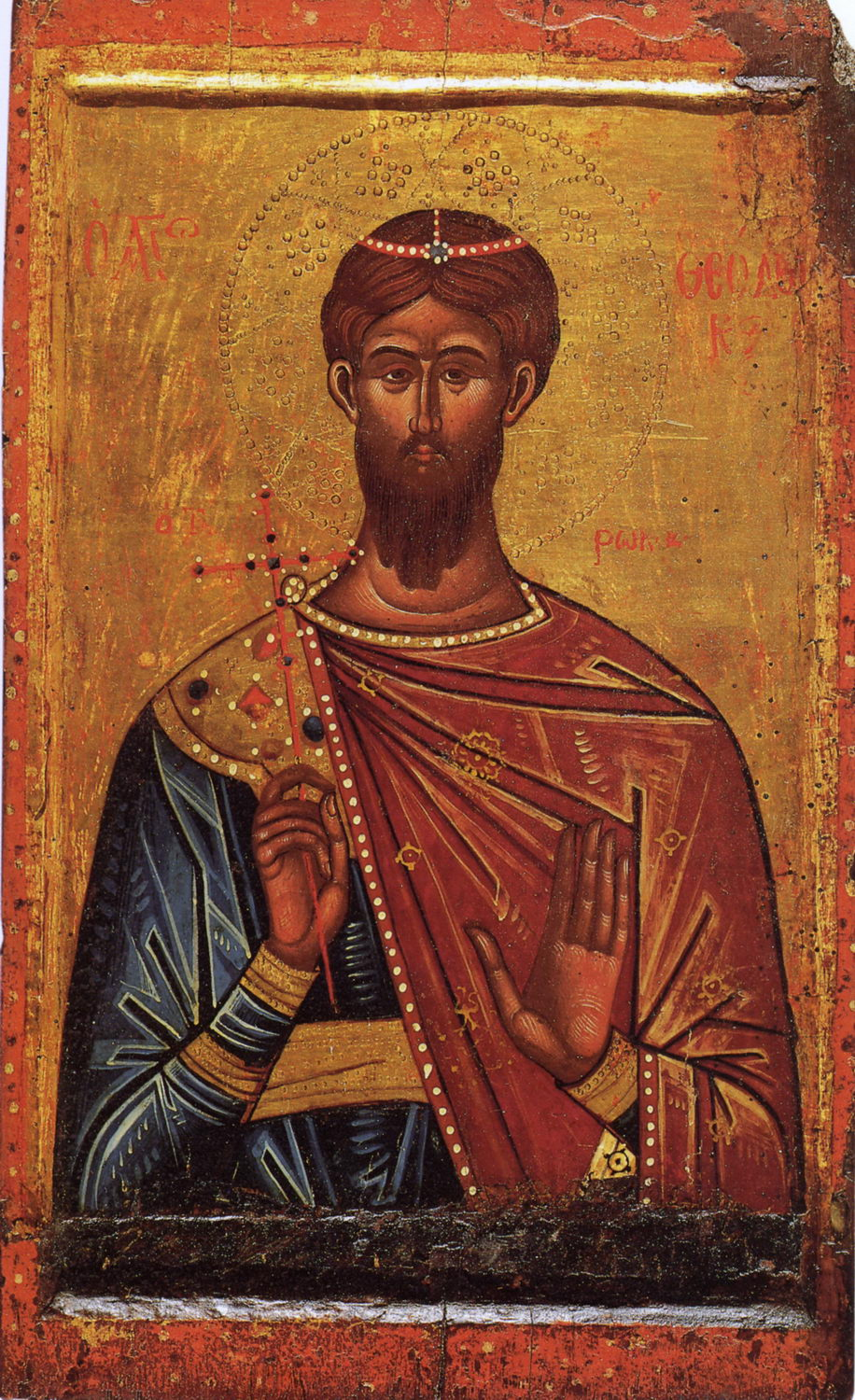
Theodore of Amasea

== Notable works ==
- The Second Coming Greek Institute Venice, Italy
- Deesis with Christ, St Andrew and St Paraskevi Ioannis Theologos Monastery Patmos, Greece
- The Descent from the Cross Katholikon of Lavra Monastery Mount Athos, Greece

== Bibliography ==
- Hatzidakis, Manolis (1987). Greek Painters after the Fall (1450-1830) Volume A. Center for Modern Greek Studies E.I.E.
- Hatzidakis, Manolis & Drakopoulou, Eugenia (1997). Greek Painters after the Fall (1450-1830) Volume B. Center for Modern Greek Studies E.I.E.
- Drakopoulou, Eugenia (2010). Greek Painters after the Fall (1450-1830) Volume C. Center for Modern Greek Studies E.I.E.
