= The Vision of Constantine (Bernini) =

Sculpture by Gian Lorenzo Bernini in Vatican City

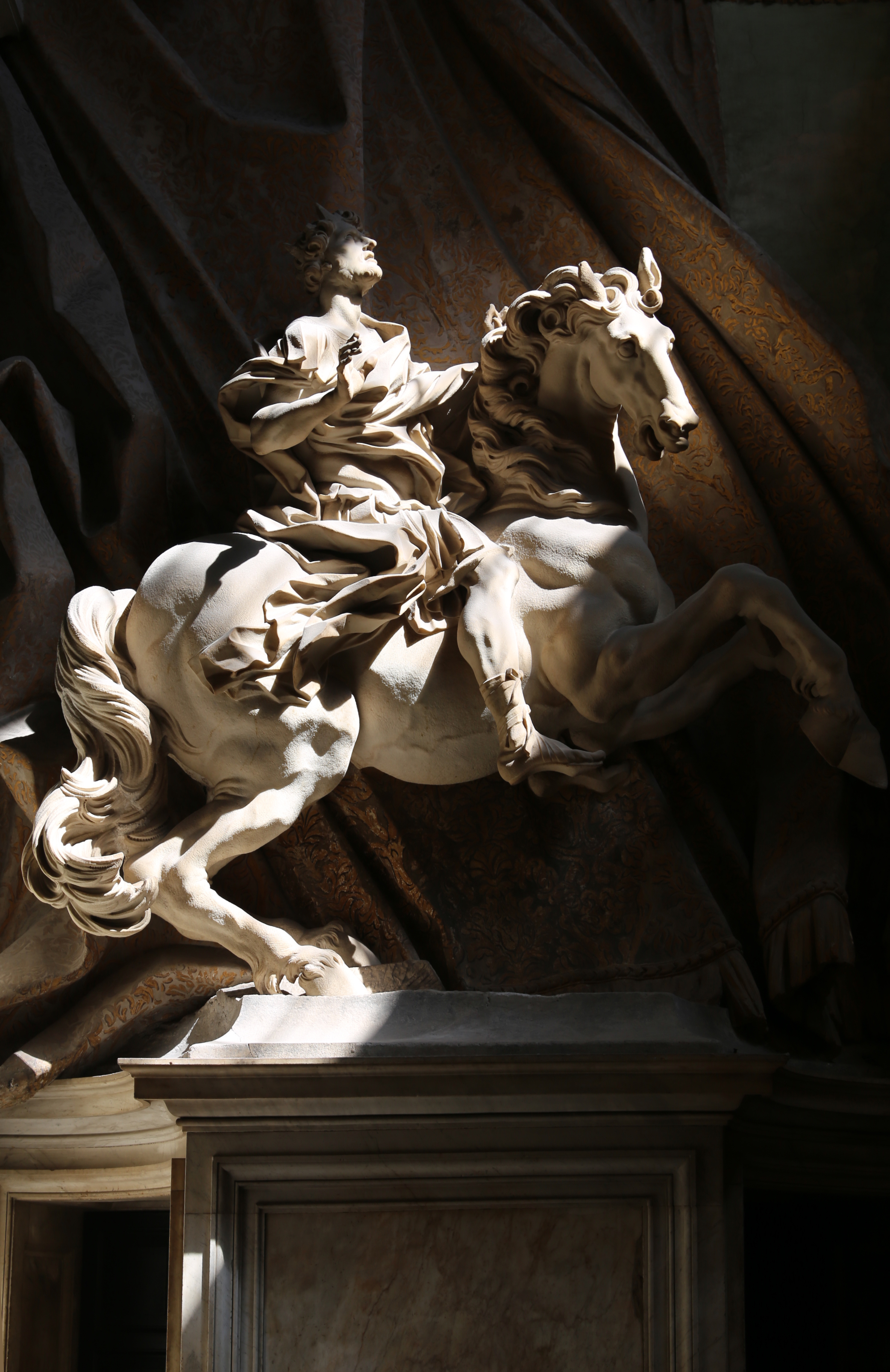
- Artist: Gian Lorenzo Bernini
- Year: 1670
- Catalogue: 73
- Type: Sculpture
- Medium: Marble
- Location: Scala Regia, Vatican City; 41°54′10″N 12°27′18″E
- Preceded by: Angel with the Superscription
- Followed by: Equestrian statue of Louis XIV (Bernini)

The Vision of Constantine is an equestrian sculpture by the Italian artist Gian Lorenzo Bernini, located in the Scala Regia by St. Peter's Basilica in Vatican City. Originally commissioned as a free standing work of art within St. Peter's itself, the sculpture was finally unveiled in 1670 as an integral part of the Scala Regia - Bernini's redesigned stairway between St. Peter's Basilica and the Vatican Palace. Unlike other large works by Bernini, art historians have suggested that this work was almost entirely undertaken by him - no other sculptors have been recorded as receiving payment. Bernini's overall fee was 7,000 Roman scudi.

== Theme ==
As an early Christian ruler, the figure of Constantine the Great was particularly appealing to later popes, particularly in the seventeenth century. Bernini's sculpture adapted one particular moment of Constantine's life.

Before a battle with the pagan Roman Emperor, Maxentius, Constantine was leading prayers with his army. After a while a cross appeared in the sky, above the sun, shining brightly and with the inscription In Hoc Signo Vinces or '"By this sign, you will conquer"'. The miracle astonished Constantine and his troops and gave them sufficient belief to overwhelm Maxentius at the Battle of Milvian Bridge, after which Constantine made a triumphal entry to Rome, with which he granted religious toleration, thus freeing the Christians from Roman persecution.

== Commissioning ==
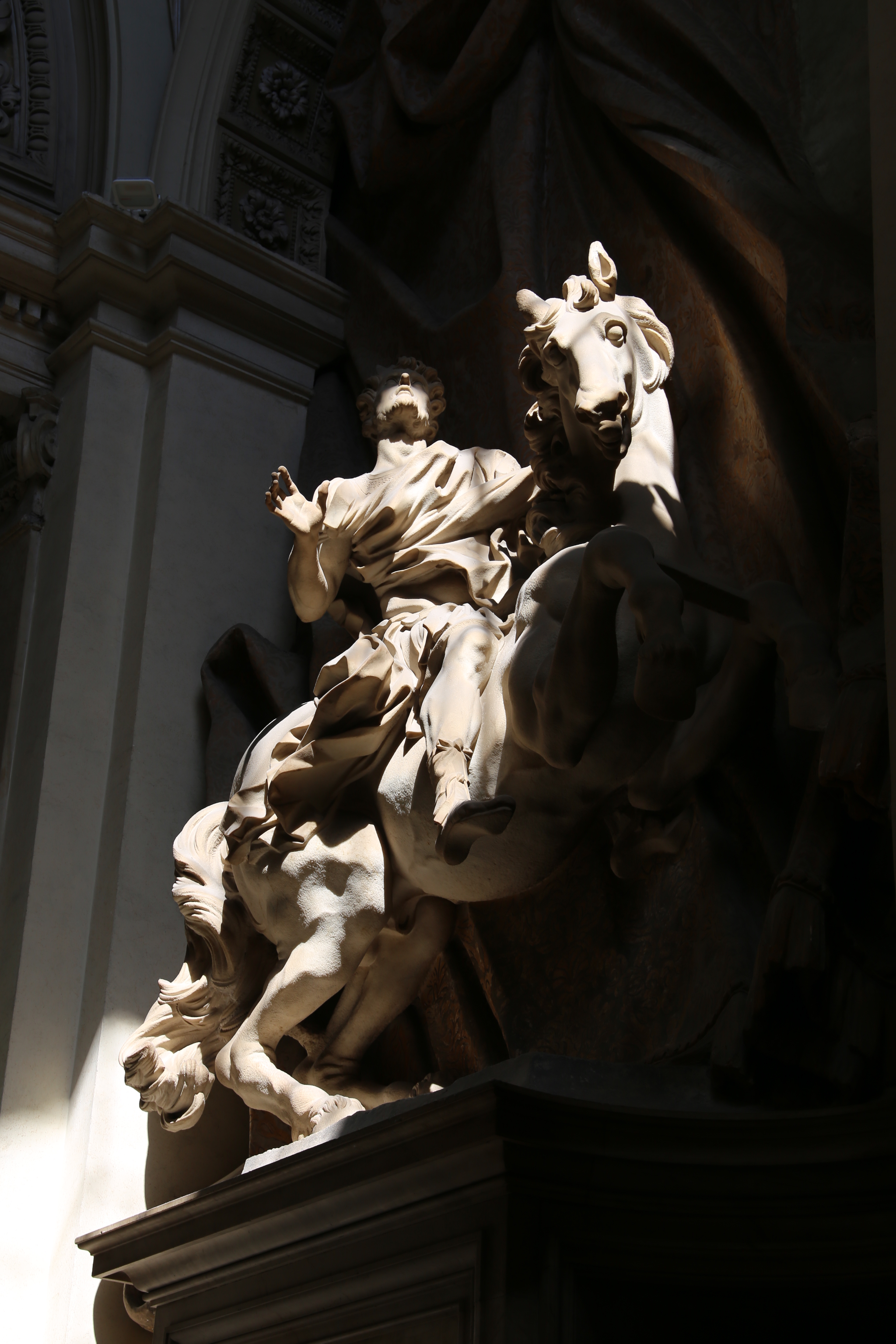
Side view. The actual daylight from the original window purposely contributes to give the sense of "vision"

The sculpture has a long history, beginning in 1654, when Bernini began the work, quite possibly commissioned by Pope Innocent X. The original plan was to place the sculpture within St Peter's Basilica. However, when Alexander VII assumed the papal throne a year later, the project was reinvigorated, securing the arrival of a large block of marble which Bernini could use to put existing drawings and sketches into practice. However, for reasons that are unclear, the project was delayed again, and Bernini did not start work on the block until 1662.

It was only at an undefined point in the 1660s that the location for the statue become the new Scala Regia that Bernini himself was designing. Bernini continued refining the equestrian sculpture, and changes were made to the design to cope with the new location on the Scala Regia. Huge clay models of the sculpture were placed within the niche, giving Bernini an idea of what the final composition would look like when placed in situ. Because of the tallness of the niche, overwhelming the sculpture, folding, dynamic drapery was added to the overall decorative effect, to be placed behind the marble horse.

This allowed Bernini to make the final touches to Constantine, and it was declared ready at the end of 1668

Transporting the sculpture from Bernini's studio to Scala Regia took ten days and required guards to look after it during the night. A variety of straw, winches, planks and beams, plus sledges and oxen were needed to pull the massive sculpture. It finally arrived on 12 January 1669. Architectural and decorative work (such as the drapery) on the niche around the sculpture continued through 1669, as did polishing of the statue itself.

== Contemporary criticism ==
Apart from a brief period of papal disgrace in 1640s, Bernini had enjoyed much acclaim from the population and aristocracy of Rome. Yet the Constantine sculpture was criticised immediately after it was unveiled. A variety of published pamphlets attested to the weaknesses of sculpture - that the Cross which was inspiring Constantine's reaction was invisible to many viewers thus making the meaning of the story difficult to understand; that the sculpture seemed stuck between being a relief or a free standing sculpture;. there were also questions of the historical inaccuracy of presenting Constantine as a youthful figure with a short beard. It was also noted that Constantine was without any of the equipment of a rider, such as saddle or reins. The lack of realism in the sculpture - Bernini sacrificing representation accuracy in depicting the horse ("exaggerated length of the horse, the curvature of the body ... the long neck, immense tail .. the oddly shaped ears" ) in order to provide a greater sense of movement - was also keenly pointed out by the seventeenth-century writers.

== Modern criticism ==
Perhaps because of its relative inaccessibility (unless one has special access to the Vatican, the sculpture is only visible from one viewpoint, under the portico of St Peter's), the statue of Constantine has received little art historical attention. This also may be due to the quality of received opinions about the quality of the sculpture of itself. Lavin passes over the work in his Bernini and the Unity of the Visual Arts, and Avery (in his "Bernini: Genius of the Baroque") says very little. Even Marder, the only art historian to concentrate an entire book on Constantine and the Scala Regia, admits that "We may never know what the equestrian statue of Constantine looked like before it was finished in situ, but one guess is that it possessed greater formal power in Bernini's mind". Rudolf Wittkower is much more generous - "The monument is placed in front of an enormous wind-swept drapery, and this device enhanced the beholder’s belief in the sudden interruption of the rider’s progress and make his fascinated reclining and the reactions registered simultaneously by the animal an extraordinarily convincing experience."

== See also ==
- List of works by Gian Lorenzo Bernini
