= Demetrios Stavrakis =

Greek painter

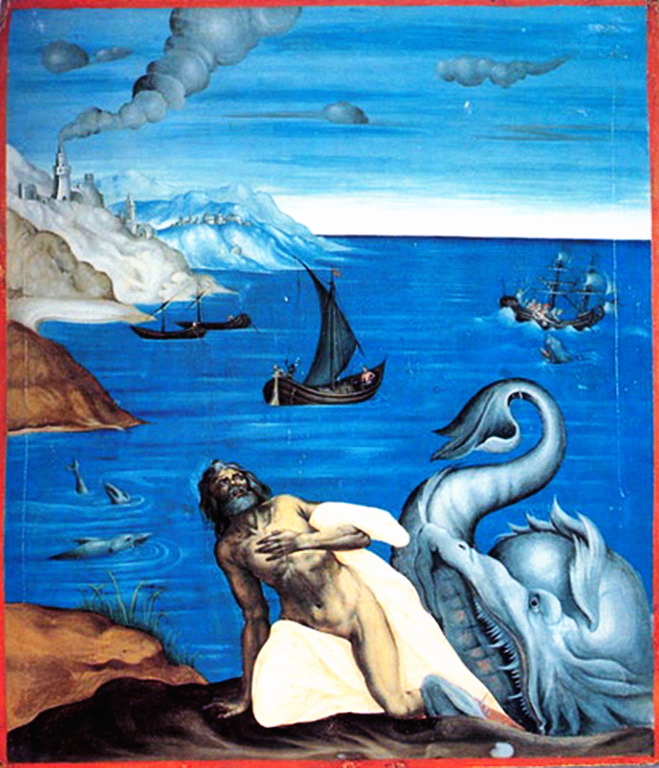
- The Prophet Jonah
- Born: 1735-1740; Zakynthos, Greece
- Died: 1801; Zakynthos, Greece
- Known for: Iconography and hagiography
- Movement: Heptanese School; Greek Rococo; Neoclassicism

Demetrios Stavrakis (Greek: Δημήτριος Σταυράκης, 1735/40 – 1801), also known as the so-called Romanos (Greek: ο λεγόμενος Ρωμανός) was a Greek painter of the Heptanese School. His uncles were famous painters Andreas Stavrakis and Stylianos Stavrakis, active on the island of Zakynthos. Demetrios influenced both Greek and Italian artists. According to the Institute of Neohellenic Research, fifteen of his works survived. His most notable work was The Prophet Jonah.

== History ==
He was born on the island of Zakynthos. He was a member of an elite family of painters. His uncles were Andreas Stavrakis and Stylianos Stavrakis. His uncle Andreas died in 1785. They were his teachers. Demetrios’s nickname was Romanos. His work was the traditional Greek mannerism prevalent on the Ionian Islands. His earliest known work was dated around 1755. According to records from the demolished church of Faneromeni, he painted the Holy Table inside of the alter on August 28, 1785. Demetrios was paid forty kuruş.

His painting of Jonah and the Whale was uncommon to the prevalent style. The spatial orientation and the use of blue were unique attributes. The nude figure in the painting expressed humanistic realism. The whale releases the profit on the shore. The whale and the naked figure can also have their roots in Ancient Greek mythology the figure has a Poseidon-like character. Another painting that brilliantly used the shade of blue was the Miracle of Saint Spyridon. His signature was χειρ Δημητρίου Σταυράκη.
