= Old St. Peter's Basilica =

Former church in Rome

St. Peter's Basilica
- Basilica Sancti Petri (Latin)
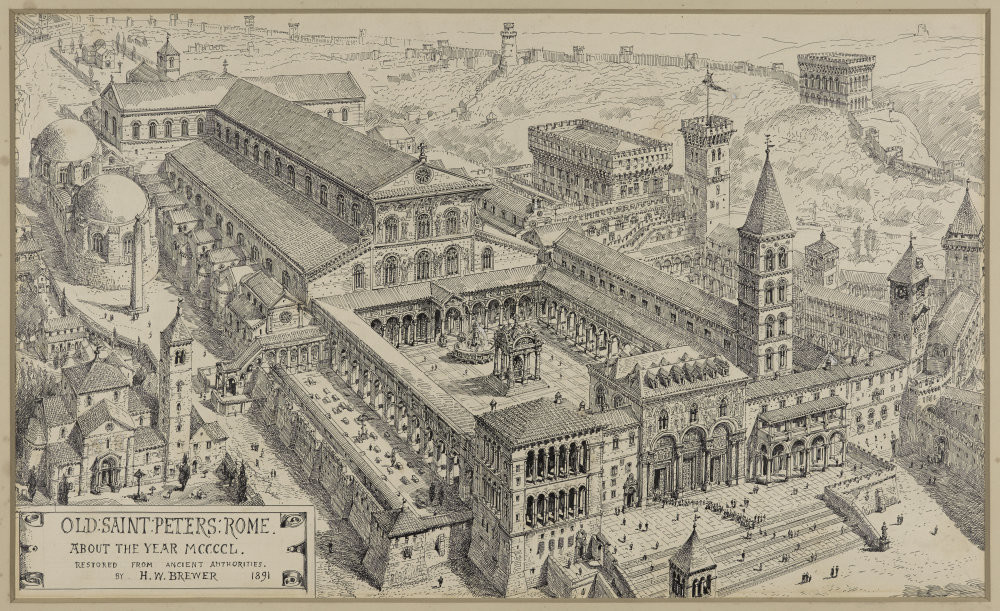
- 19th-century drawing of St. Peter's Basilica as it is thought to have looked around 1450. The Vatican obelisk is on the left, still standing on the spot where it was erected on the orders of the Emperor Caligula in 37 AD.
- St. Peter's Basilica
- 41°54′8″N 12°27′12″E
- Location: Rome
- Country: Vatican City
- Denomination: Catholic Church

History
- Status: Major basilica
- Consecrated: c. 360

Architecture
- Style: Early Christian
- Groundbreaking: Between 326 and 333
- Completed: c. 360
- Demolished: c. 1505-1605

Administration
- Diocese: Diocese of Rome

Old St. Peter's Basilica consisted of the church buildings that stood, from the 4th to 16th centuries, where St. Peter's Basilica stands today in Vatican City. Construction of the basilica, built over the historical site of the Circus of Nero, began during the reign of Roman Emperor Constantine I. The name "old St. Peter's Basilica" has been used since the construction of the current basilica to distinguish the two buildings.

== History ==
Construction began by orders of the Roman Emperor Constantine I between 318 and 322, after his conversion to Christianity and took about 40 years to complete. Over the next twelve centuries, the church gradually gained importance, eventually becoming a major place of pilgrimage in Rome.

Papal coronations were held at the basilica, and in 800, Charlemagne was crowned emperor of the Carolingian Empire there. In 846, Saracens sacked and damaged the basilica. The raiders seem to have known about Rome's extraordinary treasures. Some basilicas, such as St. Peter's Basilica, were outside the Aurelian Walls, and thus easy targets. They were "filled to overflowing with rich liturgical vessels and with jeweled reliquaries housing all of the relics recently amassed". As a result, the raiders destroyed Saint Peter's tomb and pillaged the holy shrine. In response Pope Leo IV built the Leonine wall and rebuilt the parts of St. Peter's that had been damaged.

By the 15th century, the church was falling into ruin. Discussions on repairing parts of the structure commenced upon the pope's return from Avignon. Two people involved in this reconstruction were Leon Battista Alberti and Bernardo Rossellino, who improved the apse and partially added a multi-story benediction loggia to the atrium façade, on which construction continued intermittently until the new basilica was begun. Alberti pronounced the basilica a structural abomination:

I have noticed in the basilica of St. Peter's in Rome a crass feature: an extremely long and high wall has been constructed over a continuous series of openings, with no curves to give it strength, and no buttresses to lend it support ... The whole stretch of wall has been pierced by too many openings and built too high ... As a result, the continual force of the wind has already displaced the wall more than six feet (1.8 m) from the vertical; I have no doubt that eventually some ... slight movement will make it collapse ...

At first, Pope Julius II had every intention of preserving the old building, but his attention soon turned toward tearing it down and building a new structure. Many people of the time were shocked by the proposal, as the building represented papal continuity going back to Saint Peter. The original altar was to be preserved in the new structure that housed it. The church was gradually demolished over 100 years, its last original part being demolished in 1605 and construction of the new church began the following year.

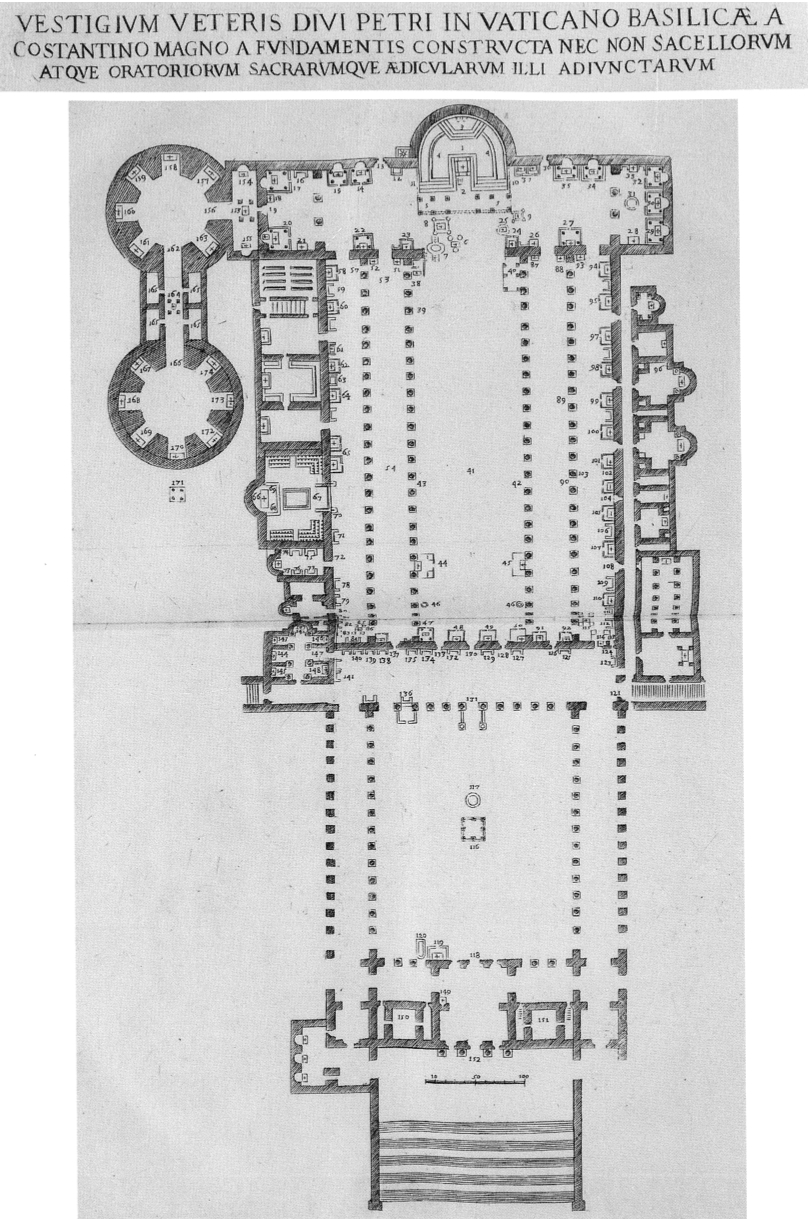
Ground plan by Tiberio Alfarano, c. 1590, locating the original chapels and tombs

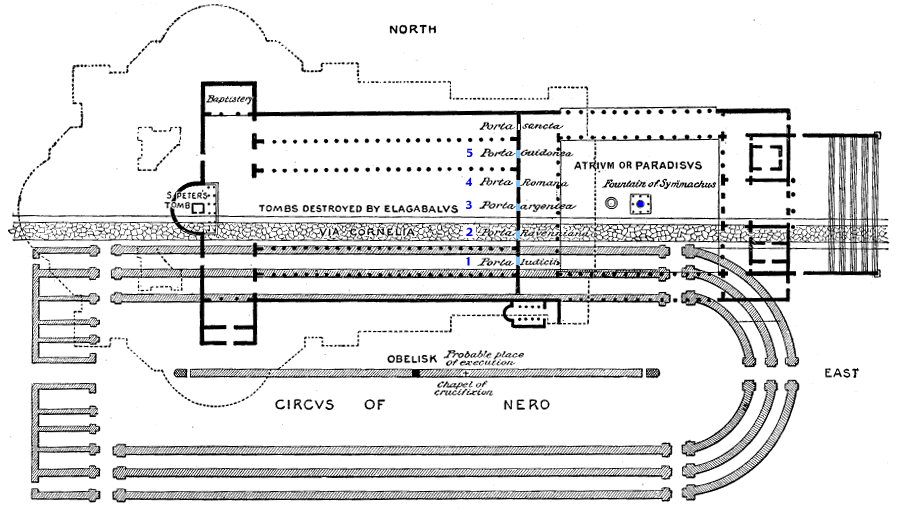
An early proposal of the location of Circus of Nero, relative to the old and current basilicas of St. Peter

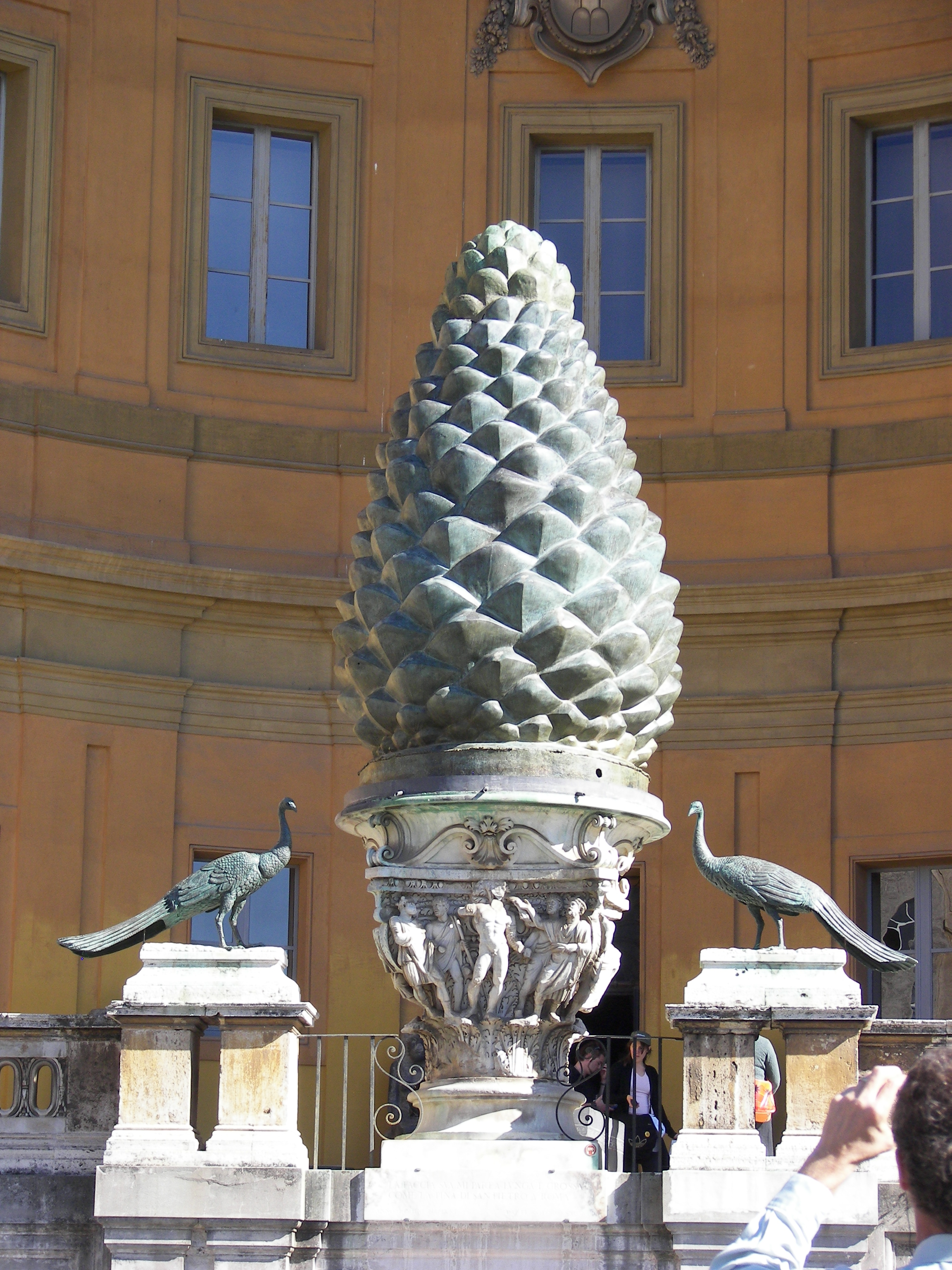
Fontana della Pigna (1st ct. AD), which stood in the courtyard of Old St. Peter's (Note: Moved again in 1608, to a vast niche of the Vatican façade at the Cortile della Pigna)

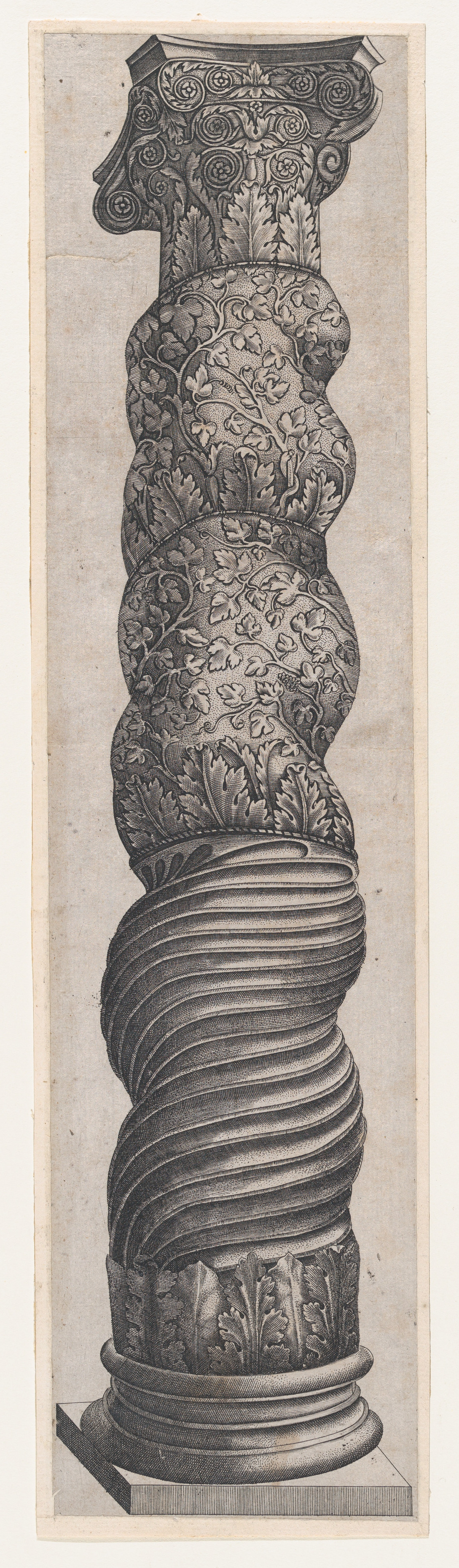
Solomonic Column

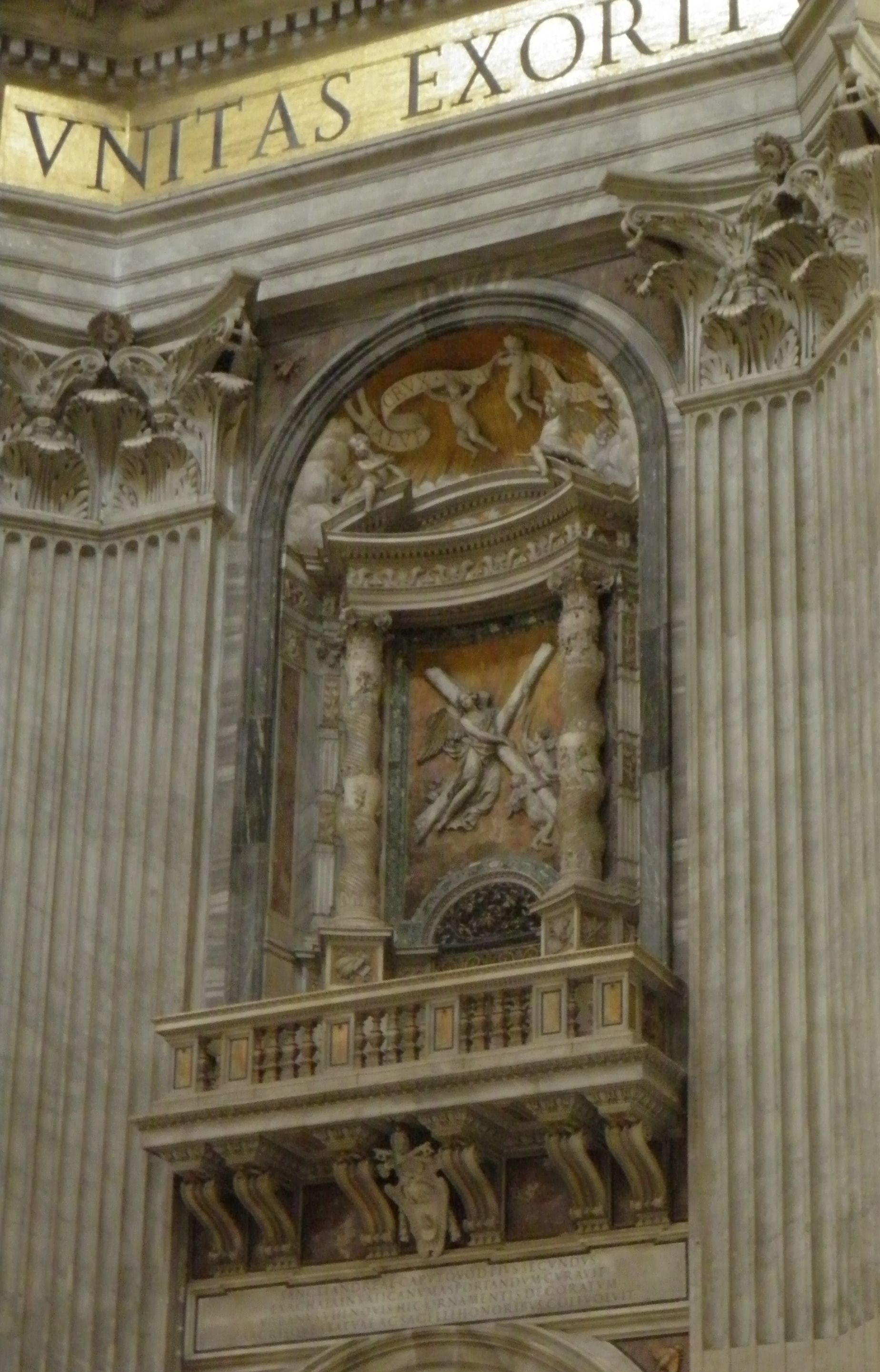
Pairs of the original Solomonic columns now support pediments to form trompe-l'œil porticoes

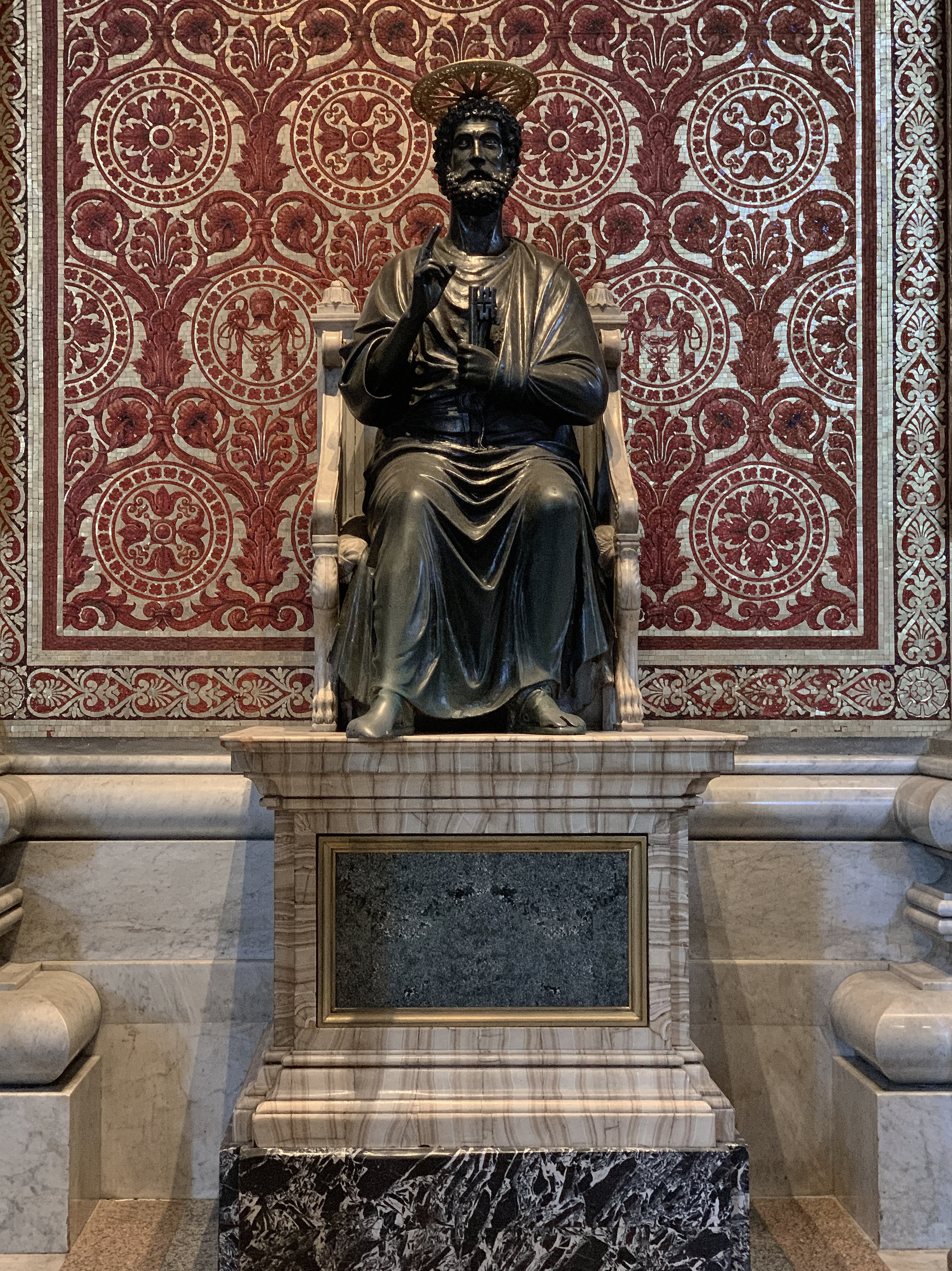
Bronze statue of Saint Peter by Arnolfo di Cambio, dating to the 13th century

== Design ==
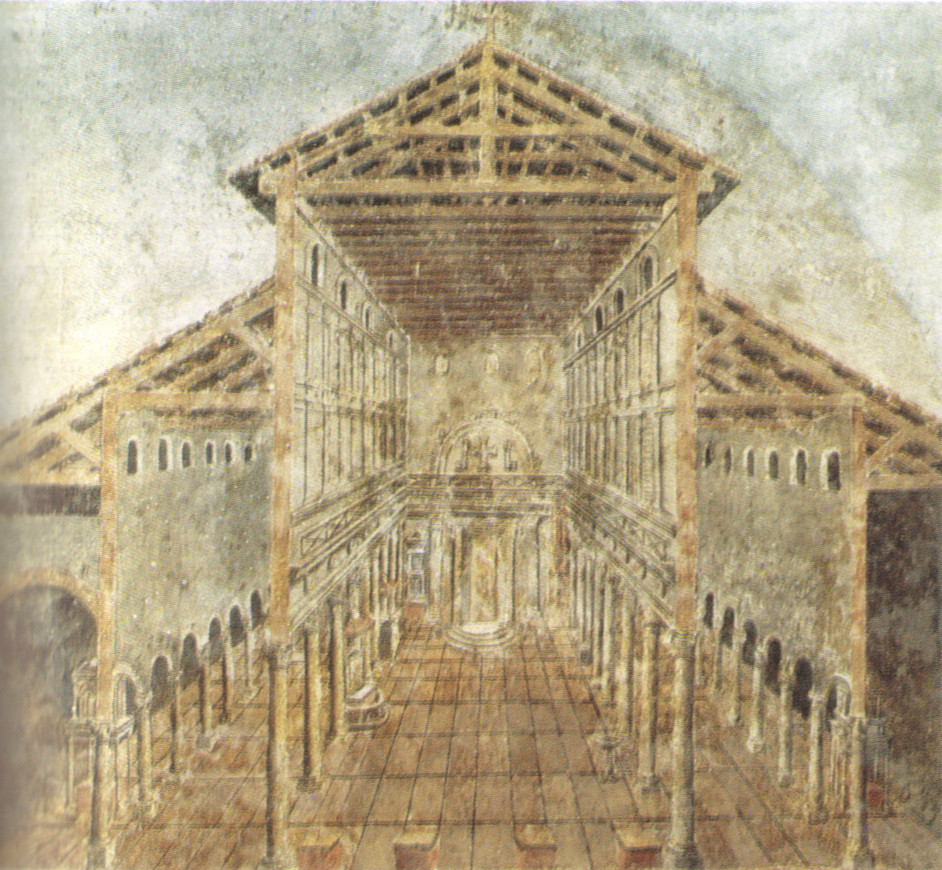
Fresco showing cutaway view of Constantine's St. Peter's Basilica as it looked in the 4th century

The design was a typical basilica form with the plan and elevation resembling those of Roman basilicas and audience halls, such as the Basilica Ulpia in Trajan's Forum and Constantine's own Aula Palatina at Trier, rather than the design of any Greco-Roman temple. The design may have been derived from the description of Solomon's Temple in 1 Kings 6.

Constantine took great pains to build the basilica on the site he and Pope Sylvester I believed to be Saint Peter's grave, which had been marked since at least the second century. This influenced the layout of the building, which was erected on the sloped Vatican Hill, on the west bank of the Tiber River. Notably, since the site was outside the boundaries of the ancient city, the apse with the altar was located in the west, so that the basilica's façade could be approached from Rome itself to the east. The exterior, unlike earlier pagan temples, was not lavishly decorated.

The church was capable of housing from 3,000 to 4,000 worshipers at one time. It consisted of five aisles, a wide central nave and two smaller aisles to each side, which were each divided by 21 marble columns, taken from earlier pagan buildings. It was over 350 feet (110 m) long, built in the shape of a Latin cross, and had a gabled roof which was timbered on the interior and which stood at over 100 feet (30 m) at the center. In the 6th century, an atrium—known as the "Garden of Paradise"—was added at the entrance and had five doors, which led to the body of the church.

The altar of Old St. Peter's Basilica used several Solomonic columns. According to tradition, Constantine took these columns from the Temple of Solomon and gave them to the church; however, the columns were probably from an Eastern church. When Gian Lorenzo Bernini built his St. Peter's Baldachin to cover the new St. Peter's altar, he drew from the twisted design of the old columns. Eight of the original columns were moved to the piers of the new St. Peter's.

=== Mosaics ===
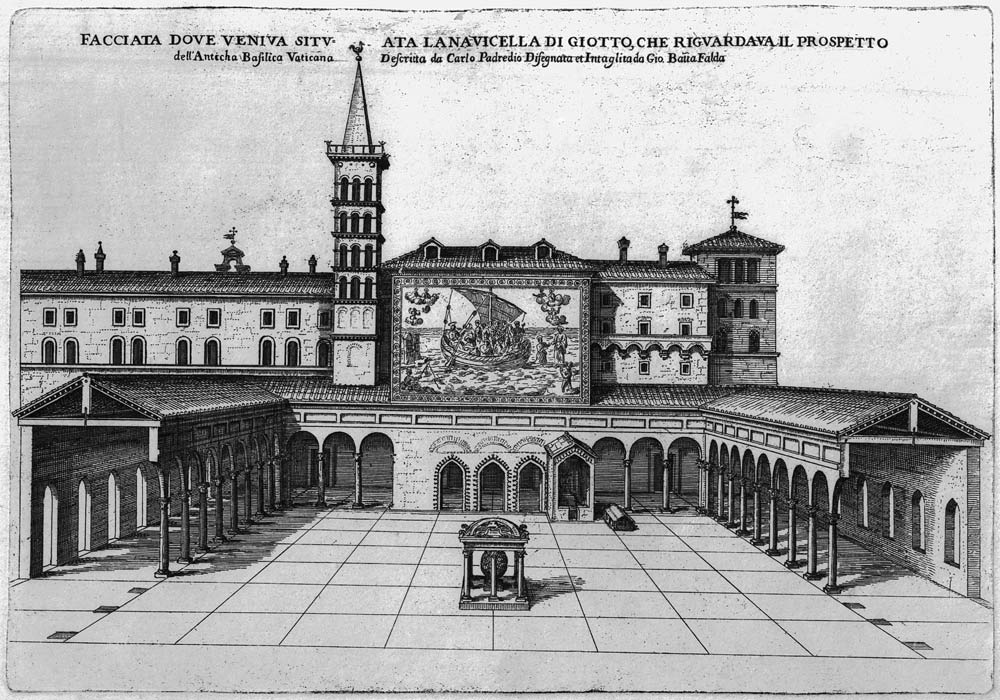
1673 engraving showing the Navicella mosaic's placement on the basilica

The great Navicella mosaic (1305–1313) in the atrium is attributed to Giotto di Bondone. This giant mosaic, commissioned by Cardinal Jacopo Stefaneschi, occupied the whole wall above the entrance arcade facing the courtyard. It depicted St. Peter walking on the waters. This extraordinary work was mainly destroyed during the construction of the new St. Peter's in the 16th century, but fragments were preserved. Navicella means "little ship" referring to the large boat which dominated the scene, and whose sail—filled by storm winds—loomed over the horizon. Such a natural representation of a seascape was known only from ancient works of art.

The nave ended with an arch, which held a mosaic of Constantine and Saint Peter, who presented a model of the church to Christ. On the walls, each having 11 windows, were frescoes of various people and scenes from both the Old and New Testament. According to combined statements by Ghiberti and Vasari, Giotto painted five frescoes of the life of Christ and various other panels, some of which Vasari said were "either destroyed or carried away from the old structure of St. Peter's during the building of the new walls."

The fragment of an 8th-century mosaic, the Epiphany, is one of the very rare remaining pieces of the medieval decoration of Old St. Peter's Basilica. It is kept in the sacristy of Santa Maria in Cosmedin and proves the high artistic quality of the destroyed mosaics. Another one, a standing Madonna, is on a side altar in the Basilica of San Marco in Florence.

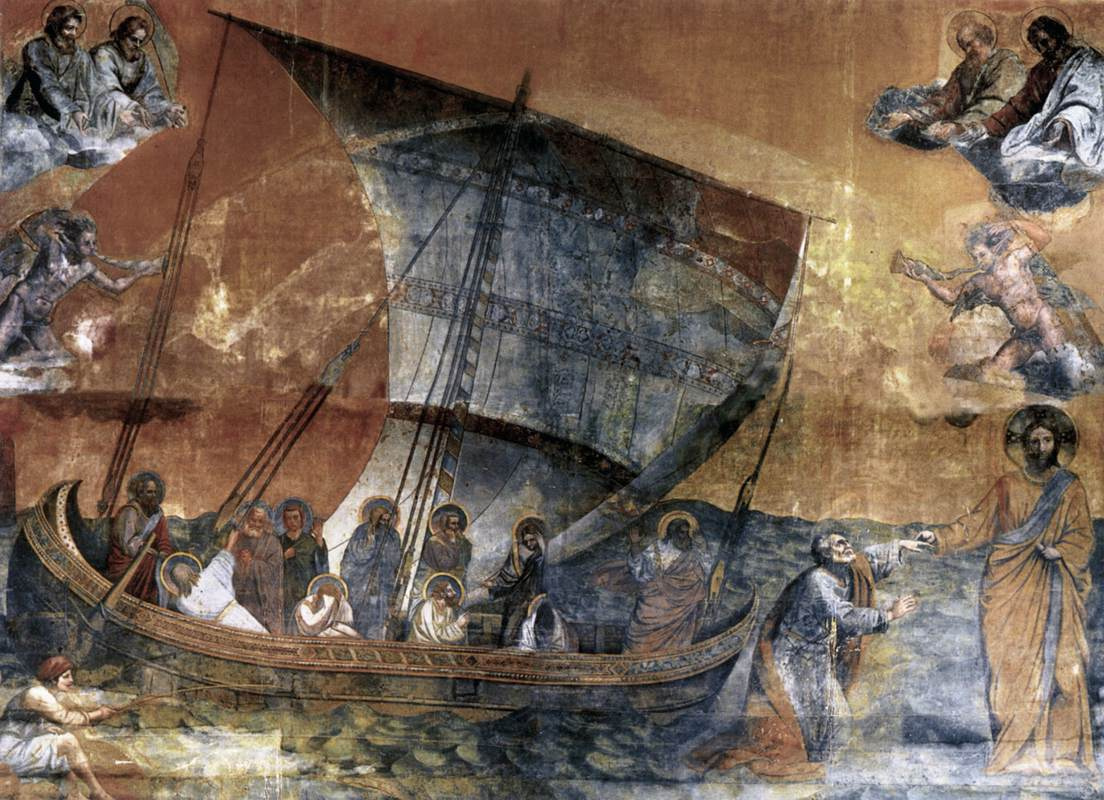
The 1628 full-size copy in oil of the huge Navicella mosaic by Giotto

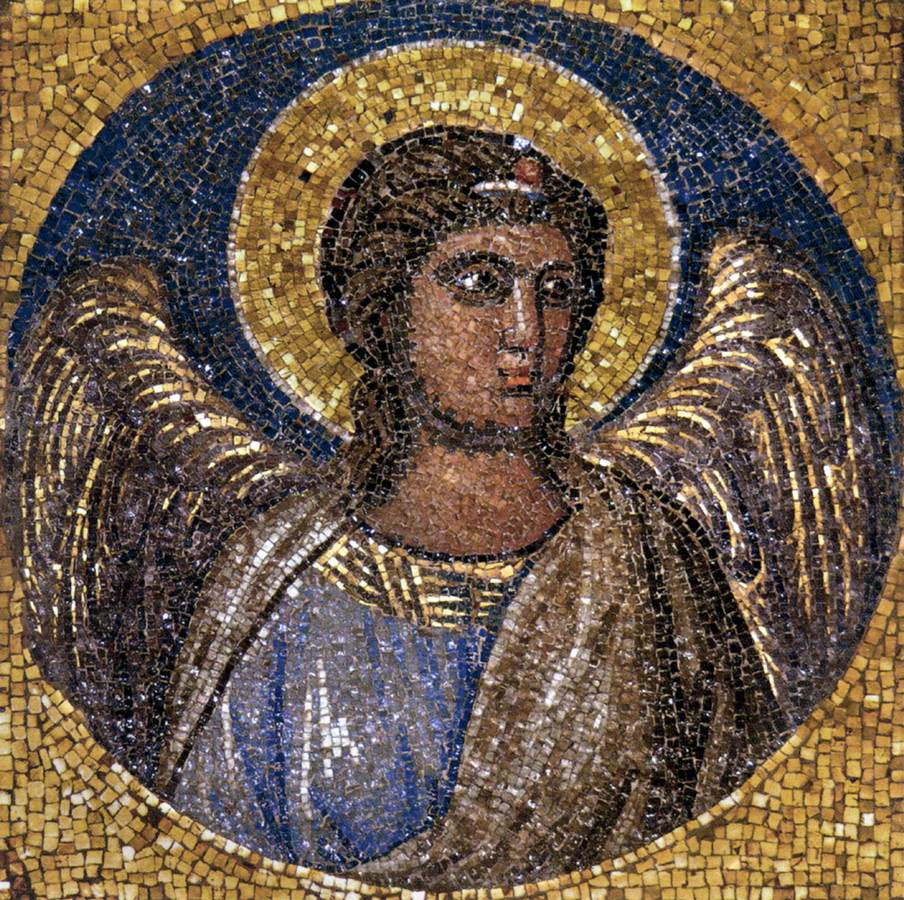
Fragment of Navicella mosaic, Boville Ernica

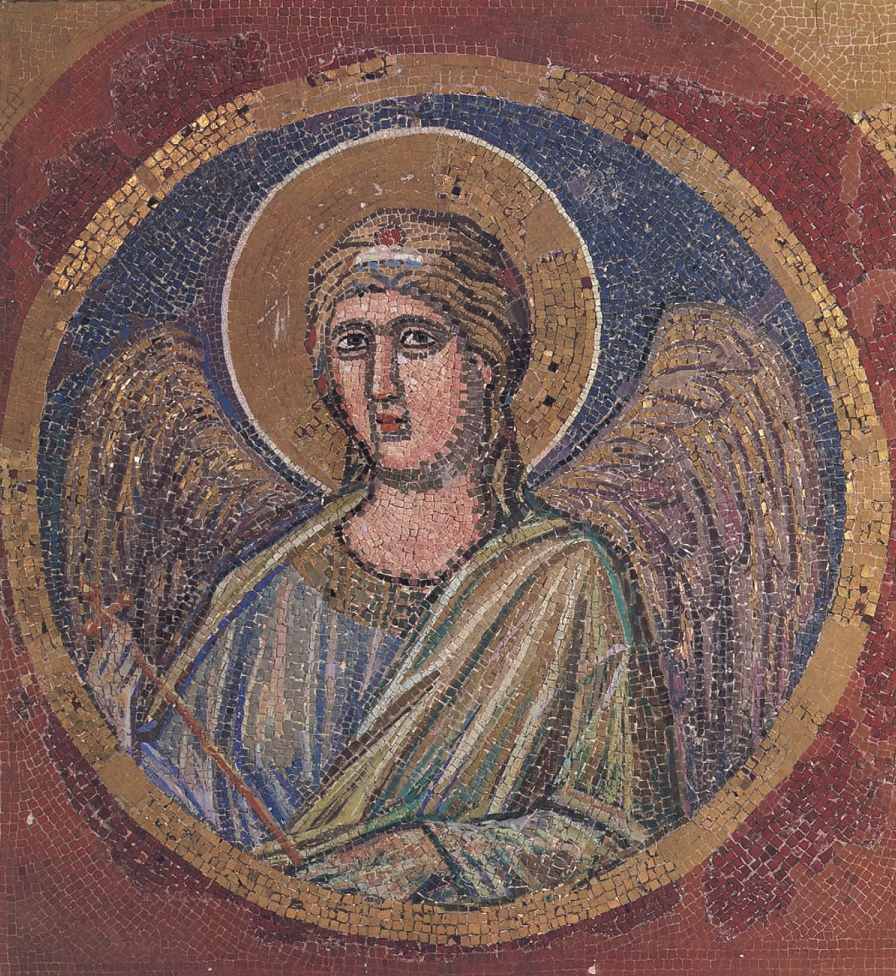
Fragment of Navicella mosaic, Vatican

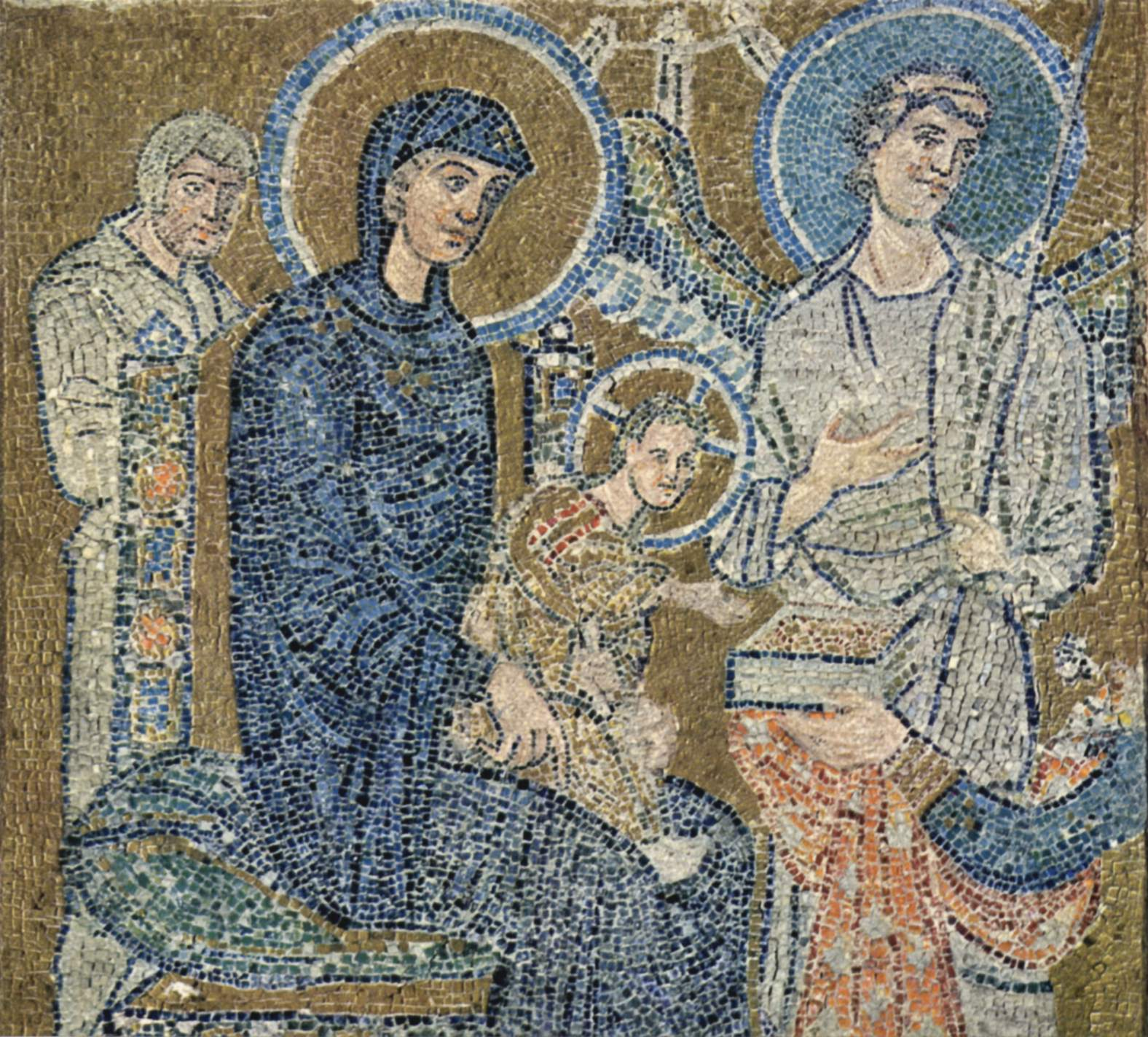
Mosaic of the Adoration of the Magi, Santa Maria in Cosmedin

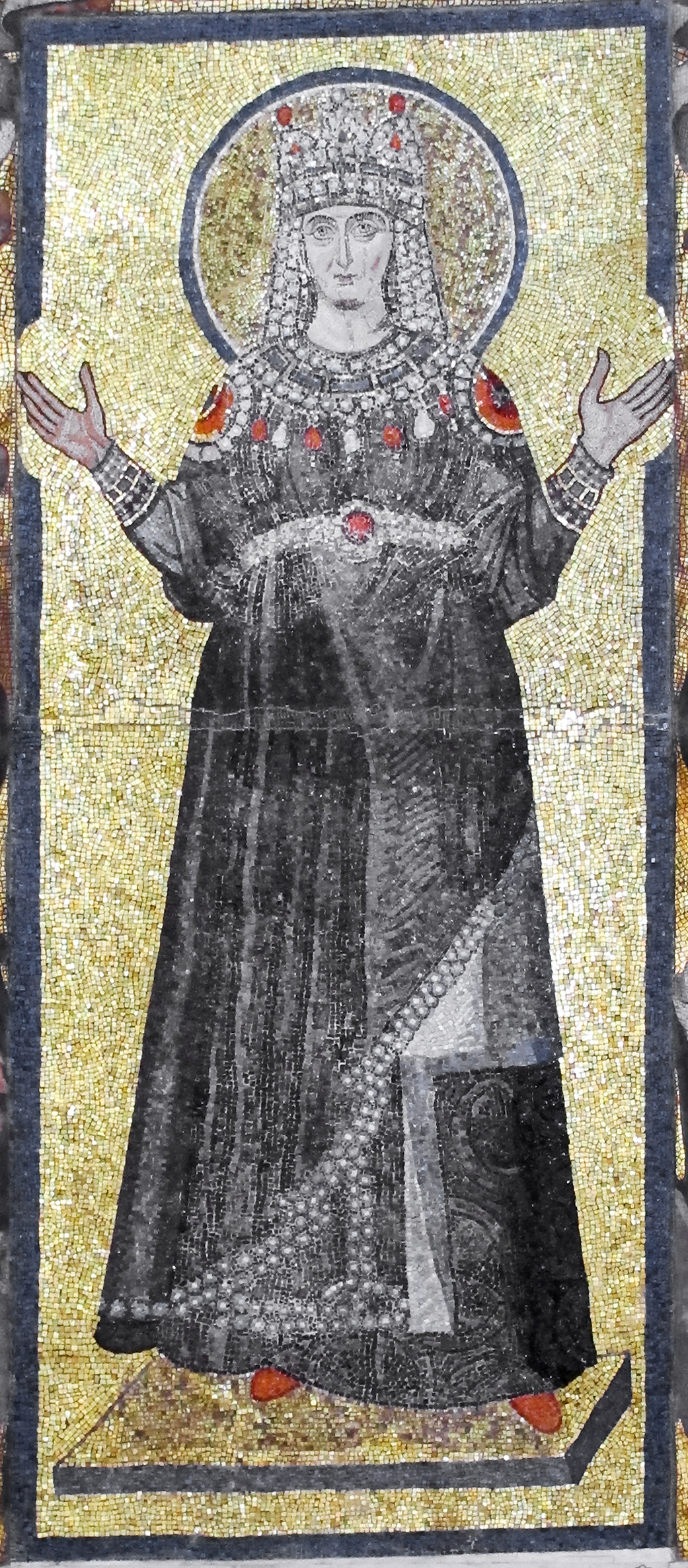
Mater misericordiae, today in San Marco in Florence

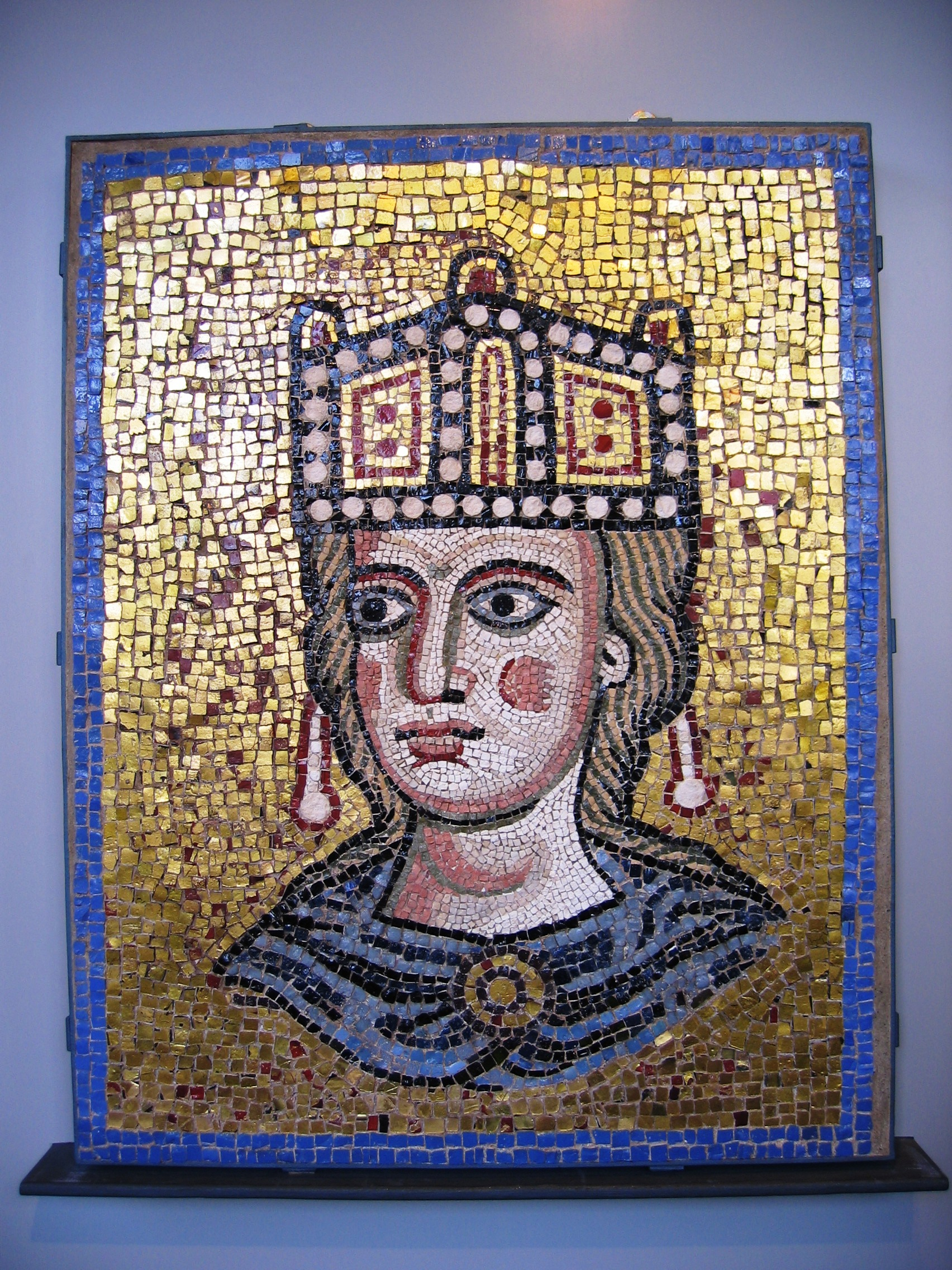
Mosaic, today in the Museo Barracco

== Tombs ==
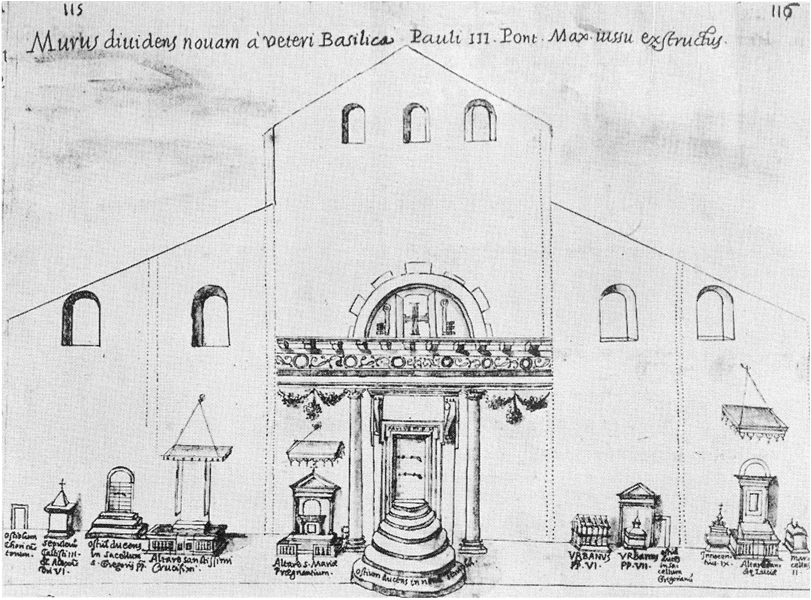
A sketch by Giacomo Grimaldi of the interior of St. Peter's during its reconstruction, showing the temporary placement of some of the tombs

Since the crucifixion and burial of Saint Peter in 64 AD, the spot was thought to be the location of the tomb of Saint Peter, where there stood a small shrine. With its increasing prestige, the church became richly decorated with statues, furnishings and elaborate chandeliers, and side tombs and altars were continuously added.

The structure was filled with tombs and bodies of saints and popes. Bones continued to be found in construction as late as February 1544.

The majority of these tombs were destroyed during the 16th and 17th centuries' demolition of Old St. Peter's Basilica (save one which was destroyed during the Saracen Sack of the church in 846). The remainder were transferred, mostly just the sarcophagi or coffins and their contents, to modern St. Peter's Basilica, which stands on the site of the original basilica, and a handful of other churches of Rome.

The only papal tombs to survive the demolition and be properly reconstructed in the present St Peter's are the two from the 1490s by Antonio del Pollaiuolo, of Pope Innocent VIII and Pope Sixtus IV. These were well-regarded and innovative works, with bronze effigies by a major Florentine sculptor.

Along with the repeated translations from the ancient Catacombs of Rome and two 14th-century fires in the Archbasilica of Saint John Lateran, the rebuilding of St. Peter's is responsible for the destruction of approximately half of all papal tombs. As a result, Donato Bramante, the chief architect of modern St. Peter's Basilica, has been remembered as Maestro Ruinante.

== Stefaneschi Triptych ==
Front and back of the Stefaneschi Triptych by Giotto
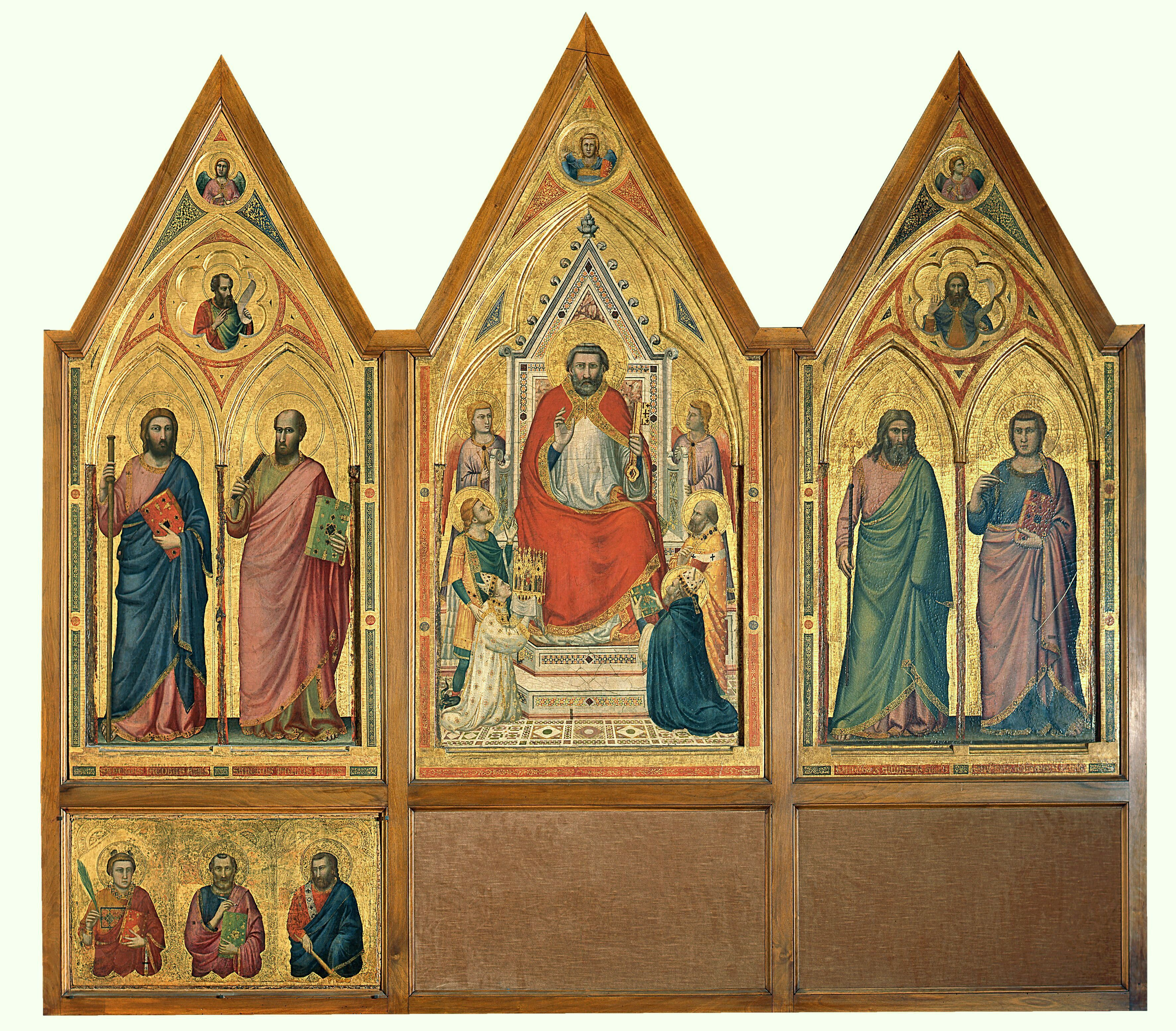
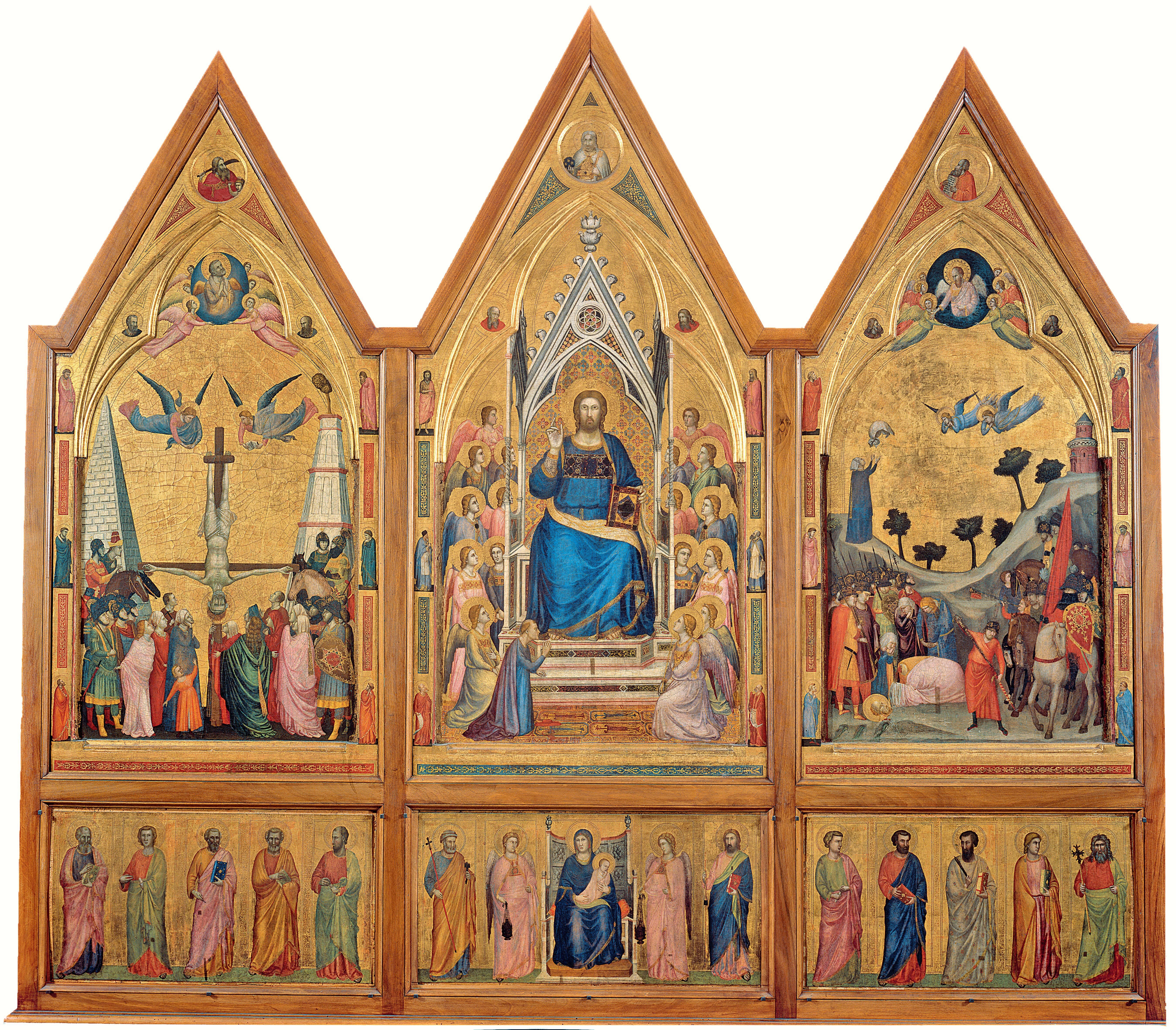
Altarpiece for Old St. Peter's, ca. 1330, tempera on wood, 220 × 245 cm; central panel: 178 × 89 cm; side panels: 168 × 83 cm; predella: each ca. 45 × 83 cm

The Stefaneschi Altarpiece is a triptych by the Italian medieval painter Giotto, commissioned by Cardinal Giacomo Gaetani Stefaneschi to serve as an altarpiece for one of the altars of Old St. Peter's Basilica in Rome.

It is a rare example in Giotto's work of a documented commission, and includes Giotto's signature, although the date, like most dates for Giotto, is disputed, and many scholars feel the artist's workshop was responsible for its execution. It had long been thought to have been made for the main altar of the church; more recent research suggests that it was placed on the "canon's altar", located in the nave, just to the left of the huge arched opening into the transept. It is now at the Pinacoteca Vaticana, Rome.

== See also ==
- List of Greco-Roman roofs
- Index of Vatican City–related articles

== Notes ==
Footnotes

Citations
