= Fontana della Pigna =

Ancient Roman fountain

- Fountain
- {{{other_names}}}
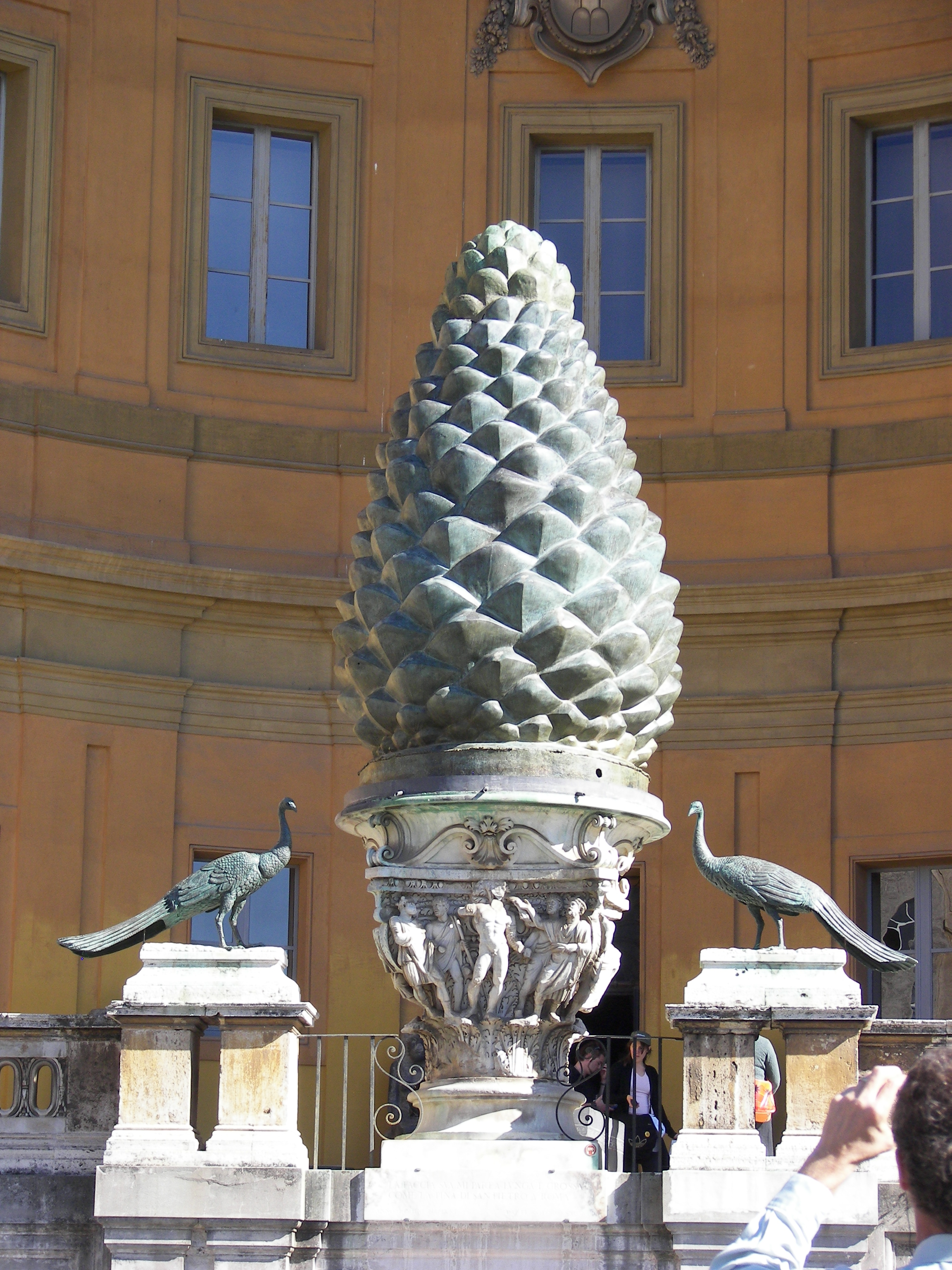
- Fontana della Pigna (1st century AD)
- Location: Rome
- Interactive map of Fontana della Pigna
- Coordinates: 41°54′23″N 12°27′16″E

The Fontana della Pigna or simply Pigna ([ˈpiɲɲa] 'pinecone') is a former Roman fountain which now decorates a vast niche in the wall of the Vatican facing the Cortile della Pigna, located in Vatican City, in Rome, Italy.

== Description ==
Composed of a large bronze pine cone almost four meters high which once spouted water from the top, the Pigna originally stood near the Pantheon next to the Temple of Isis. It was moved to the courtyard of the Old St. Peter's Basilica during the Middle Ages and then moved again, in 1608, to its present location.

The courtyard where it stands was originally part of the Cortile del Belvedere, designed by Donato Bramante to connect the palace of Pope Innocent VIII with the Sistine Chapel. When Bramante died, architect Pirro Ligorio finished the project and added the wall and niche to close the courtyard. Construction of the Vatican Library divided the Cortile del Belvedere into two areas. The upper part of the courtyard, the Cortile della Pigna, takes its name from the fountain.

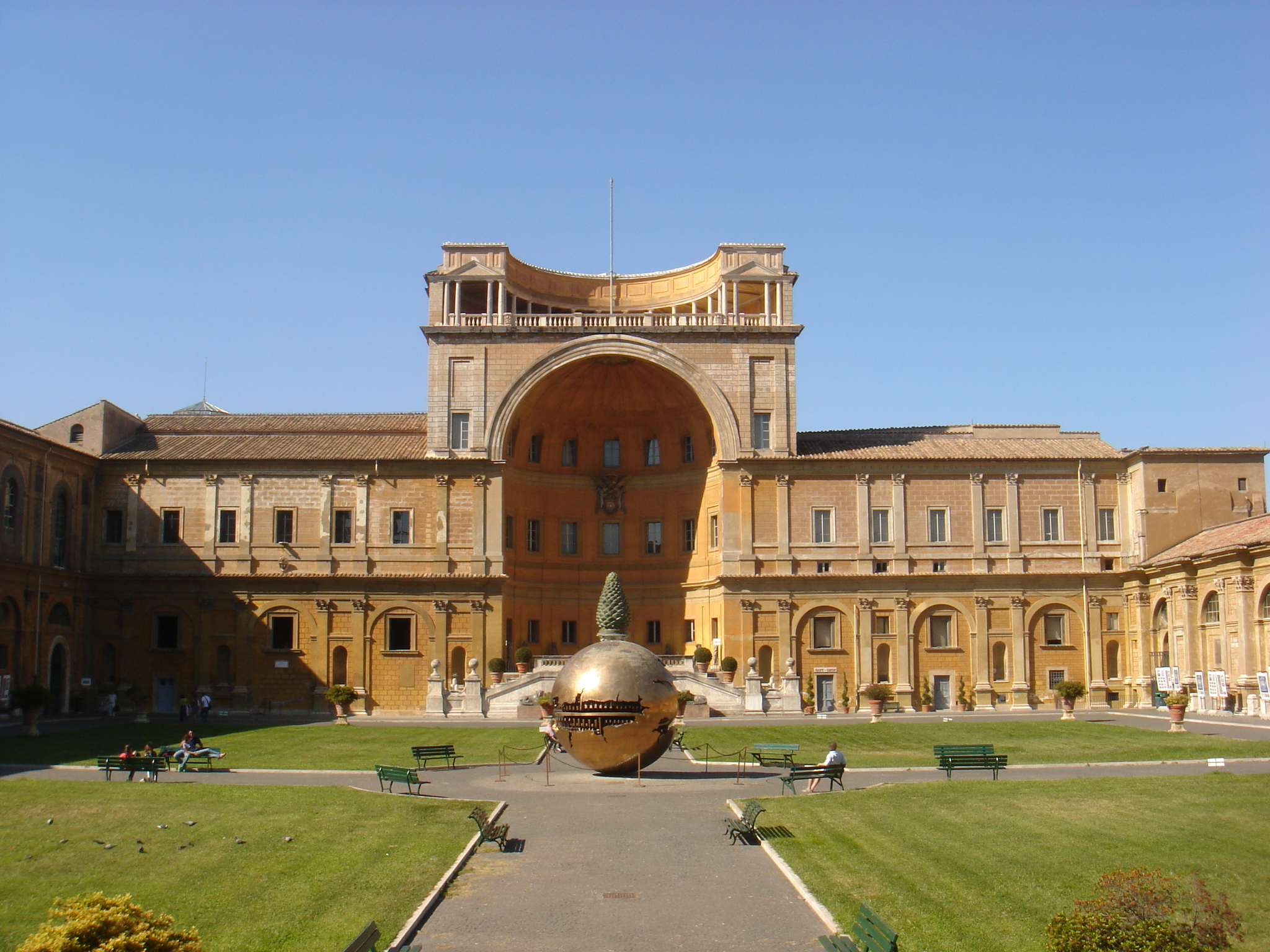
The pinecone, shown within the niche

The bronze peacocks on either side of the fountain are copies of those decorating the tomb of the Emperor Hadrian, now the Castel Sant'Angelo. The original peacocks are in the Braccio Nuovo Museum.

== Rimini fountain ==
There is another fountain known as Fontana della Pigna in Rimini, Italy, also of Ancient Roman origin but heavily restored. The pine cone sculpture crowning this fountain was only installed in 1807, replacing a 16th-century statue of St. Paul damaged by the Napoleonic army.

== In Dante's Divine Comedy ==
In his Divine Comedy, Dante describes the size of the head of the giant Nimrod by referencing this fountain:

His face appeared to me as long and large
As is at Rome the pine-cone of Saint Peter's.

== Sources ==
- Coffin, D.R. (2003). Pirro Ligorio. The Renaissance Artist, Architect, and Antiquarian. Penn State Press.
- Rendina, Claudio (2000). Enciclopedia di Roma. Rome: Netwon & Compton.
