= Belvedere Torso =

Sculpture by an Apollonios the Athenian

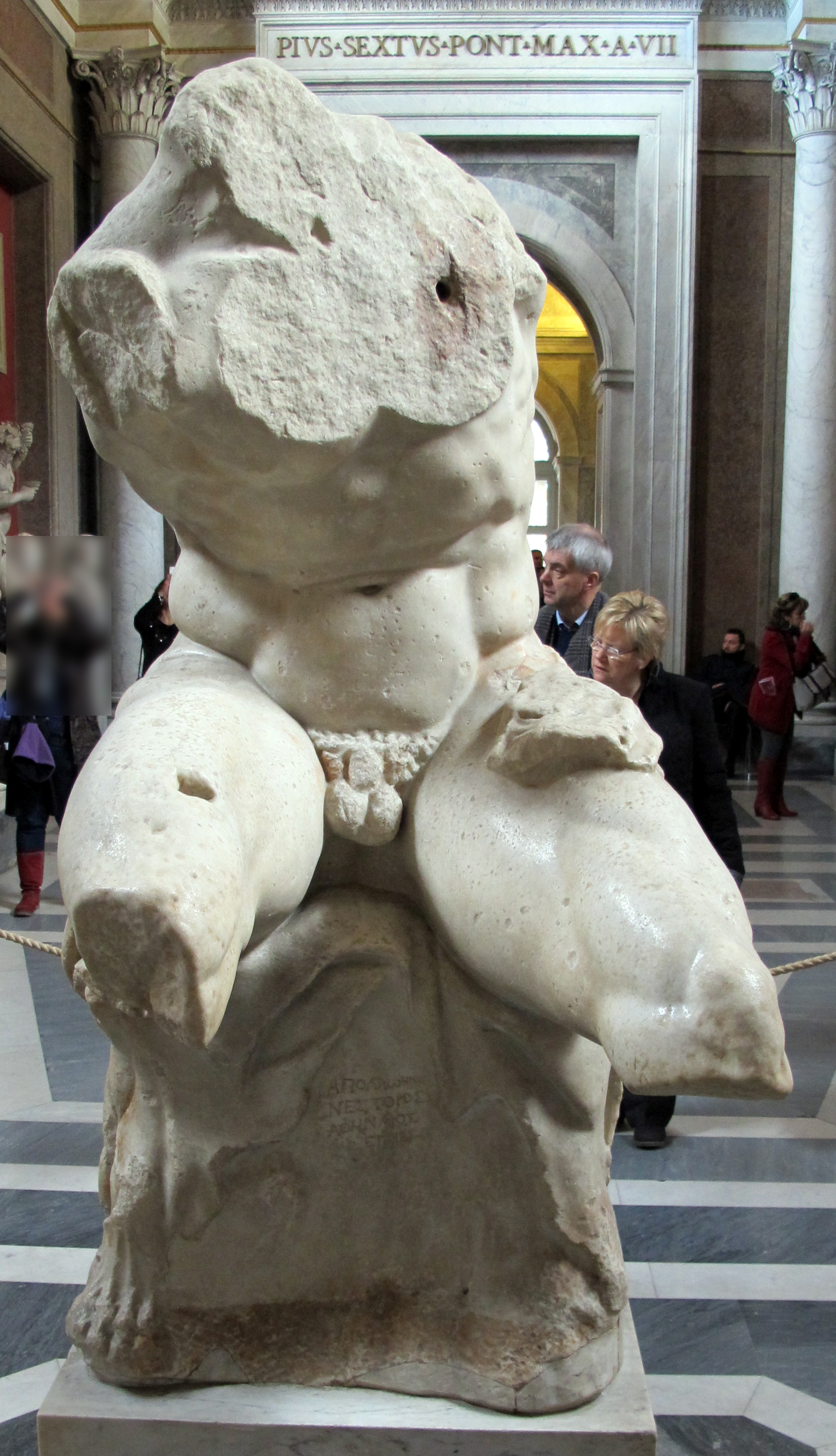
The Belvedere Torso

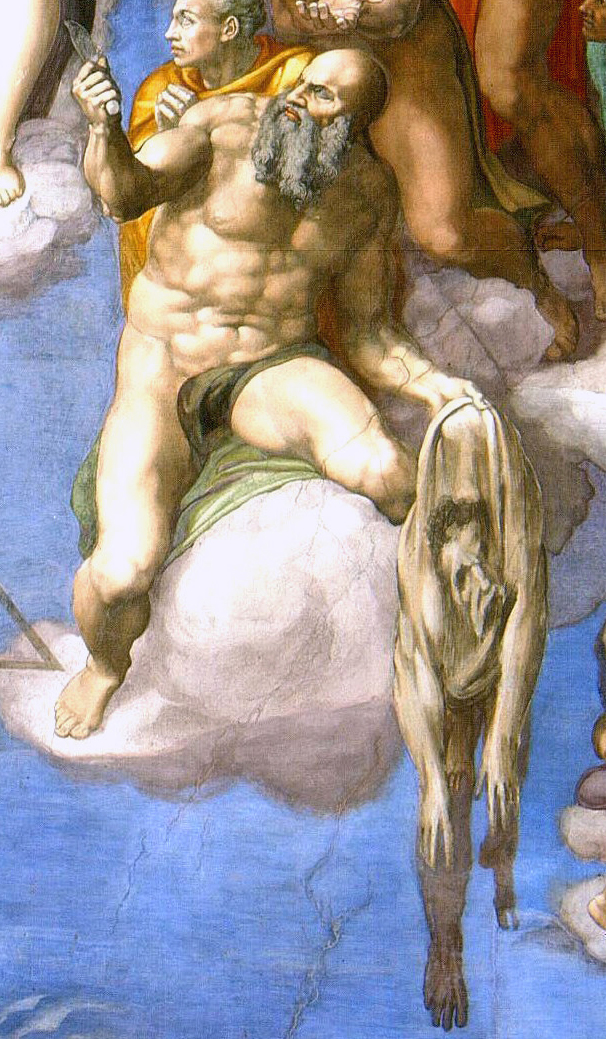
Michelangelo's The Last Judgement. Saint Bartholomew is shown holding the knife of his martyrdom and his flayed skin. The figure's torso strongly echoes the Belvedere Torso. The model is thought to be Pietro Aretino.

The Belvedere Torso is a 1.59-metre-tall (5.2 ft) fragmentary marble statue of a male nude, known to be in Rome from the 1430s, and signed prominently on the front of the base by "Apollonios, son of Nestor, Athenian", who is unmentioned in ancient literature. It is now in the Museo Pio-Clementino (Inv. 1192) of the Vatican Museums.

Once believed to be a 1st-century BC original, the statue is now thought to be a copy from the 1st century BC or AD of an older statue, probably to be dated to the early 2nd century BC.

== Description ==
The muscular male figure is portrayed seated on an animal hide, and its precise identification remains open to debate. Though traditionally identified as a Heracles seated on the skin of the Nemean lion, recent studies have identified the skin as that of a panther, occasioning other identifications (with possibilities including Polyphemus and Marsyas). According to the Vatican Museum website, "the most favoured hypothesis identifies it with Ajax, the son of Telamon, in the act of contemplating his suicide".

== History after rediscovery ==
The statue is documented in the collection of Cardinal Prospero Colonna at his family's palazzo in Monte Cavallo, Rome from 1433, not because it elicited admiration, but because the antiquarian epigrapher Ciriaco d'Ancona (or someone in his immediate circle) made note of its inscription. Around 1500 it was in the possession of the sculptor Andrea Bregno. It was still in the Palazzo Colonna during the sack of Rome in 1527, when it suffered some mutilation. Between 1530 and 1536, the sculpture was acquired by the pope. How it entered the Vatican collections is uncertain, but by the mid-16th century it was installed in the Cortile del Belvedere, where it joined the Apollo Belvedere and other famous Roman sculptures. "The Laocoön took two months from unearthing to Belvedere canonization," Leonard Barkan observed, "the Torso took a hundred years."

The contorted pose and musculature of the torso were highly influential on Renaissance, Mannerist, and Baroque artists, including Michelangelo and Raphael, and it served as a catalyst of the classical revival. Michelangelo's admiration of the Torso was widely known in his lifetime, to the extent that the Torso gained the sobriquet, "The School of Michelangelo". Legend has it that Pope Julius II requested that Michelangelo complete the statue fragment with arms, legs and a face. He respectfully declined, stating that it was too beautiful to be altered, and instead used it as the inspiration for several of the figures on the Sistine Chapel ceiling, including the Sibyls and Prophets along the borders, and both the risen Christ and St. Bartholomew in The Last Judgement. Early drawings of the Torso were made by Amico Aspertini, c. 1500–1503, by Martin van Heemskerck, c. 1532–1536, by Hendrick Goltzius, c. 1590; the Belvedere Torso entered the visual repertory of connoisseurs and artists unable to go to Rome through the engraving of it by Giovanni Antonio da Brescia, c. 1515. The Belvedere Torso remains one of the few ancient sculptures admired in the 17th and 18th centuries whose reputation has not suffered in modern times.

Several small bronze reductions of it were made during the 16th century, often restoring it as a seated Hercules.

The Belvedere Torso visited the British Museum for its 2015 exhibition on the human body in ancient Greek art.

== Gallery ==
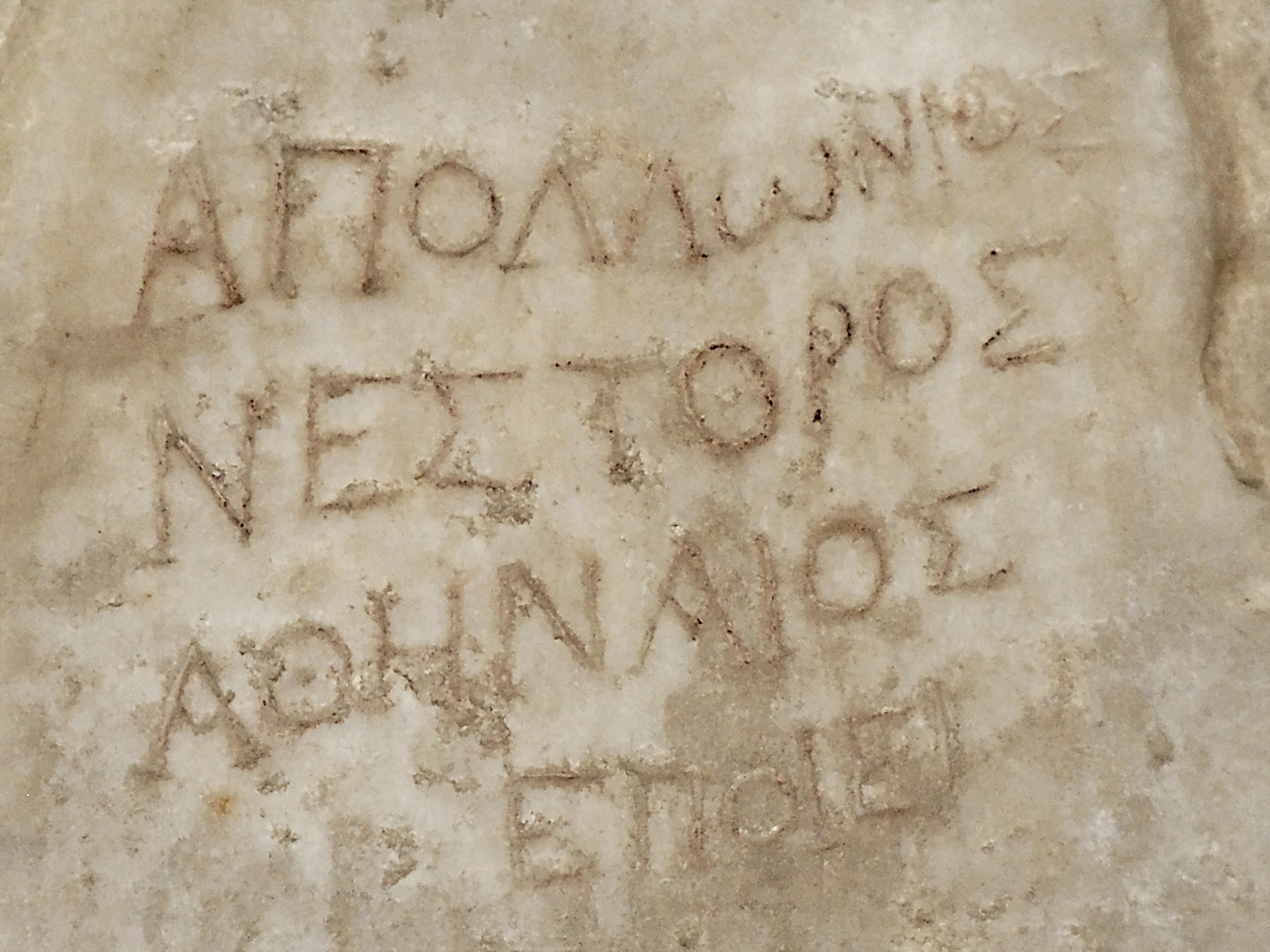
Greek inscription on the pedestal

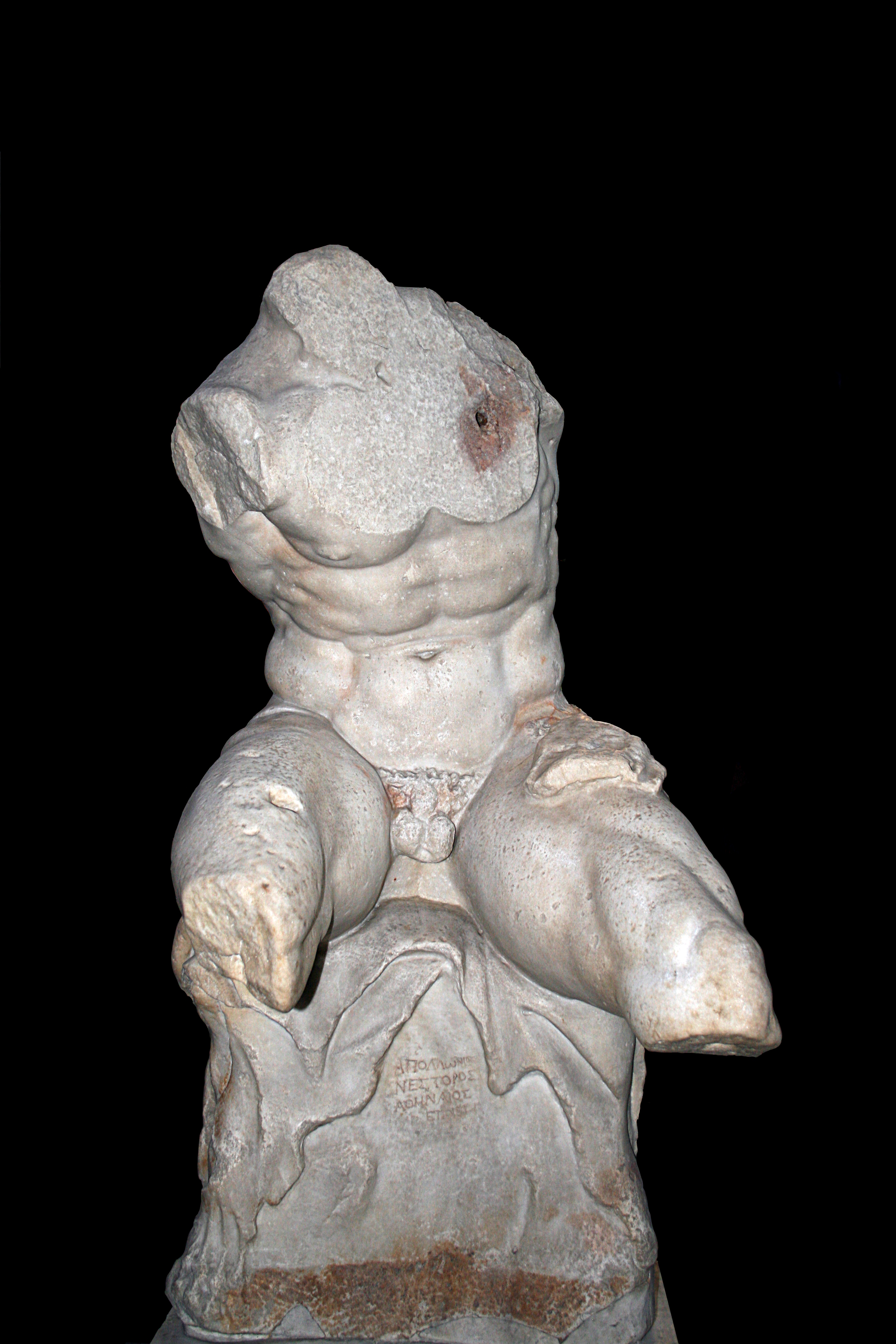
Front view showing pedestal, dark

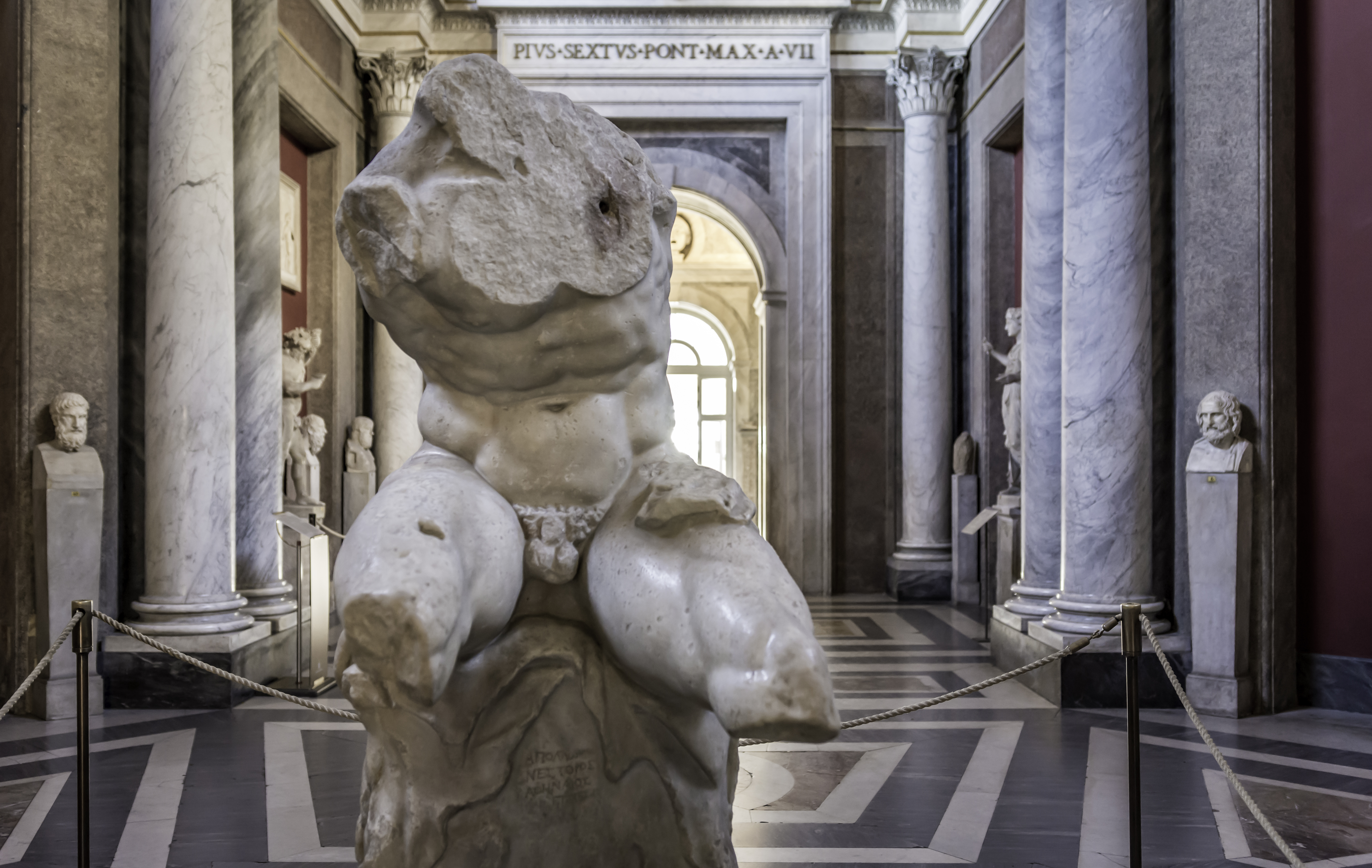
Belvedere Torso, frontal view

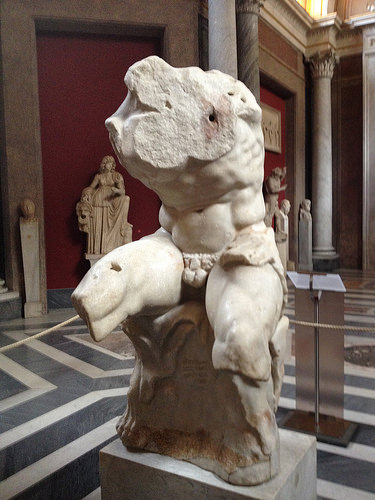
The Belvedere Torso, three-quarter view.

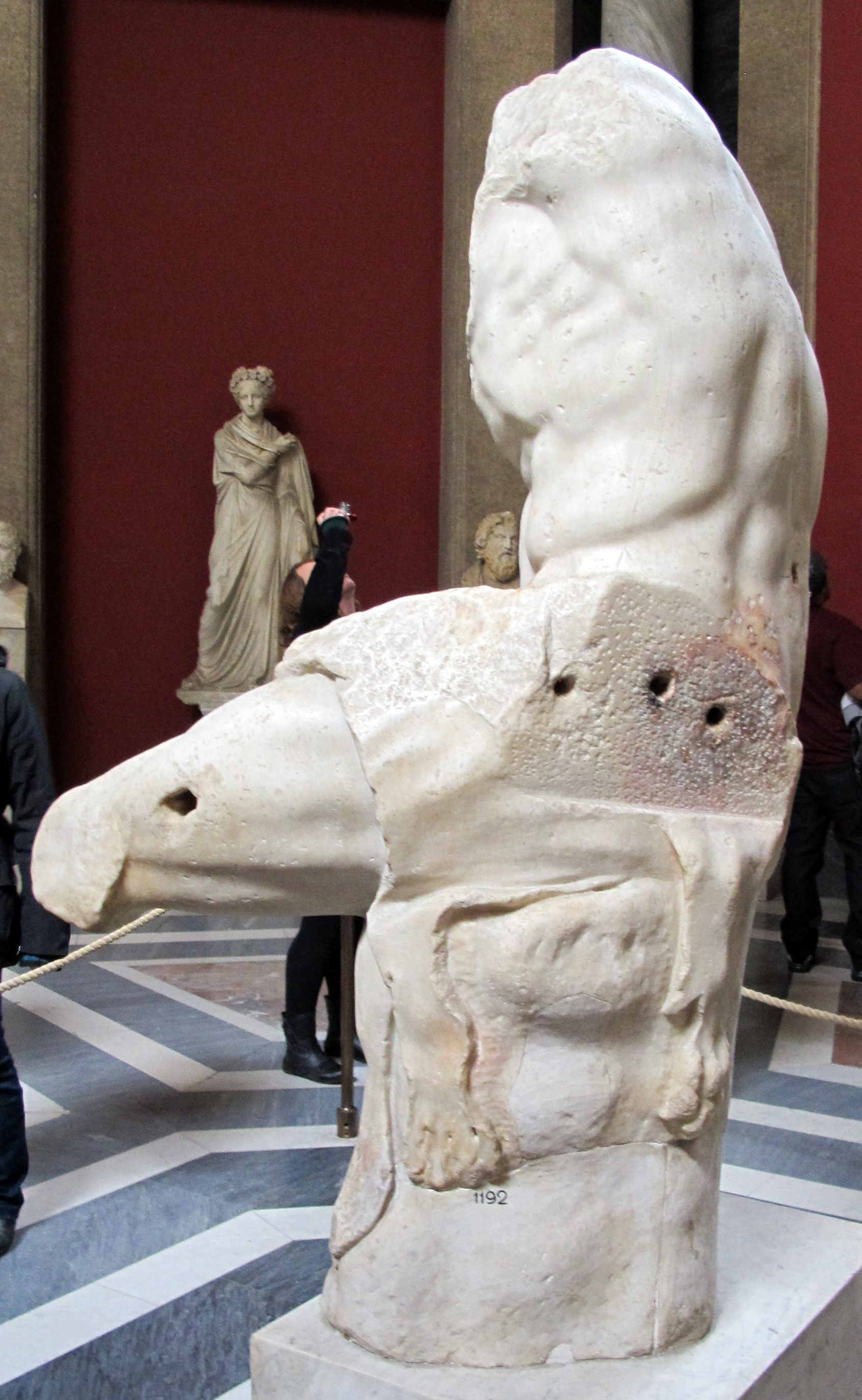
Belvedere Torso, left side view

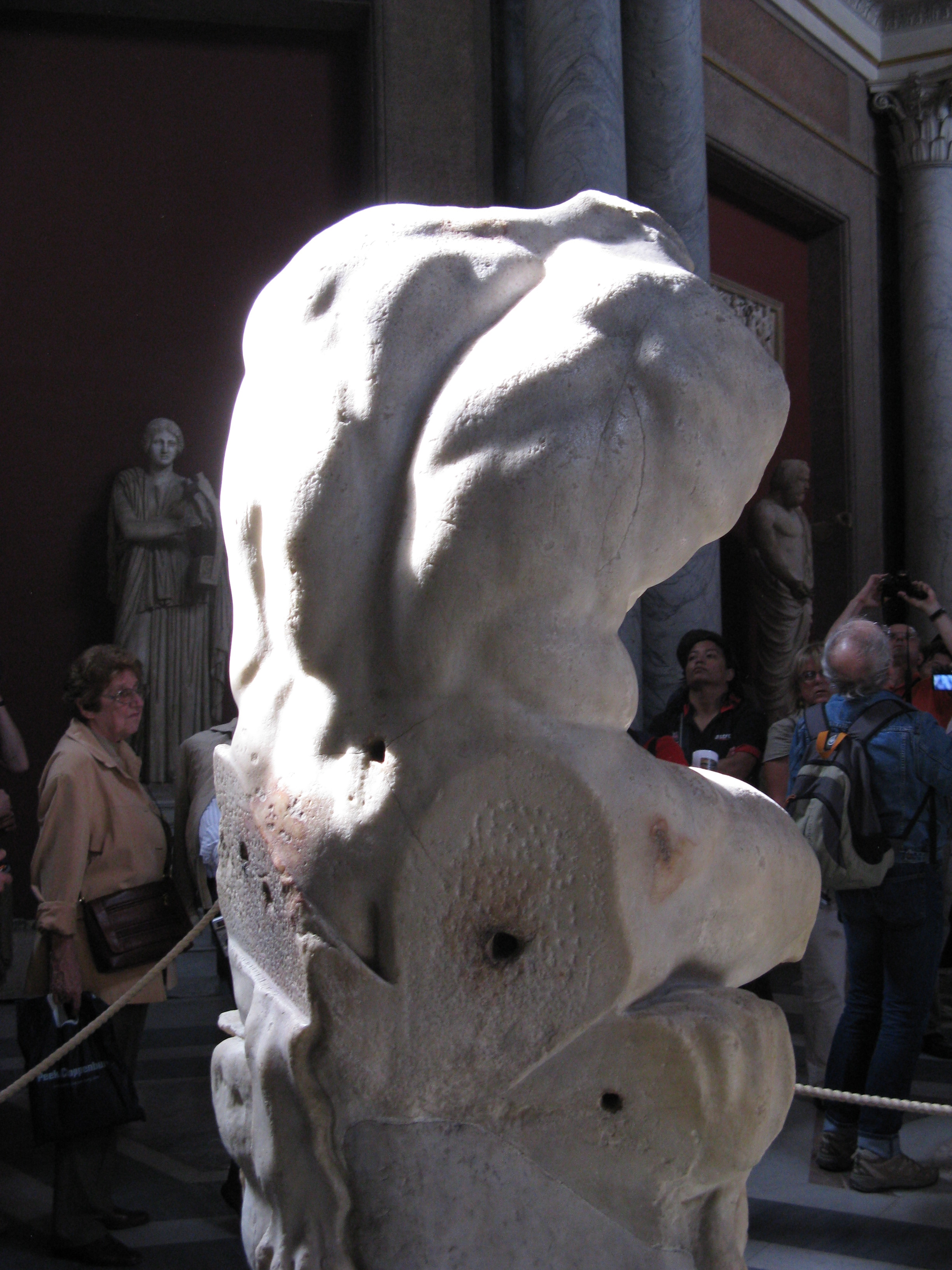
Belvedere Torso, rear view, sunlit

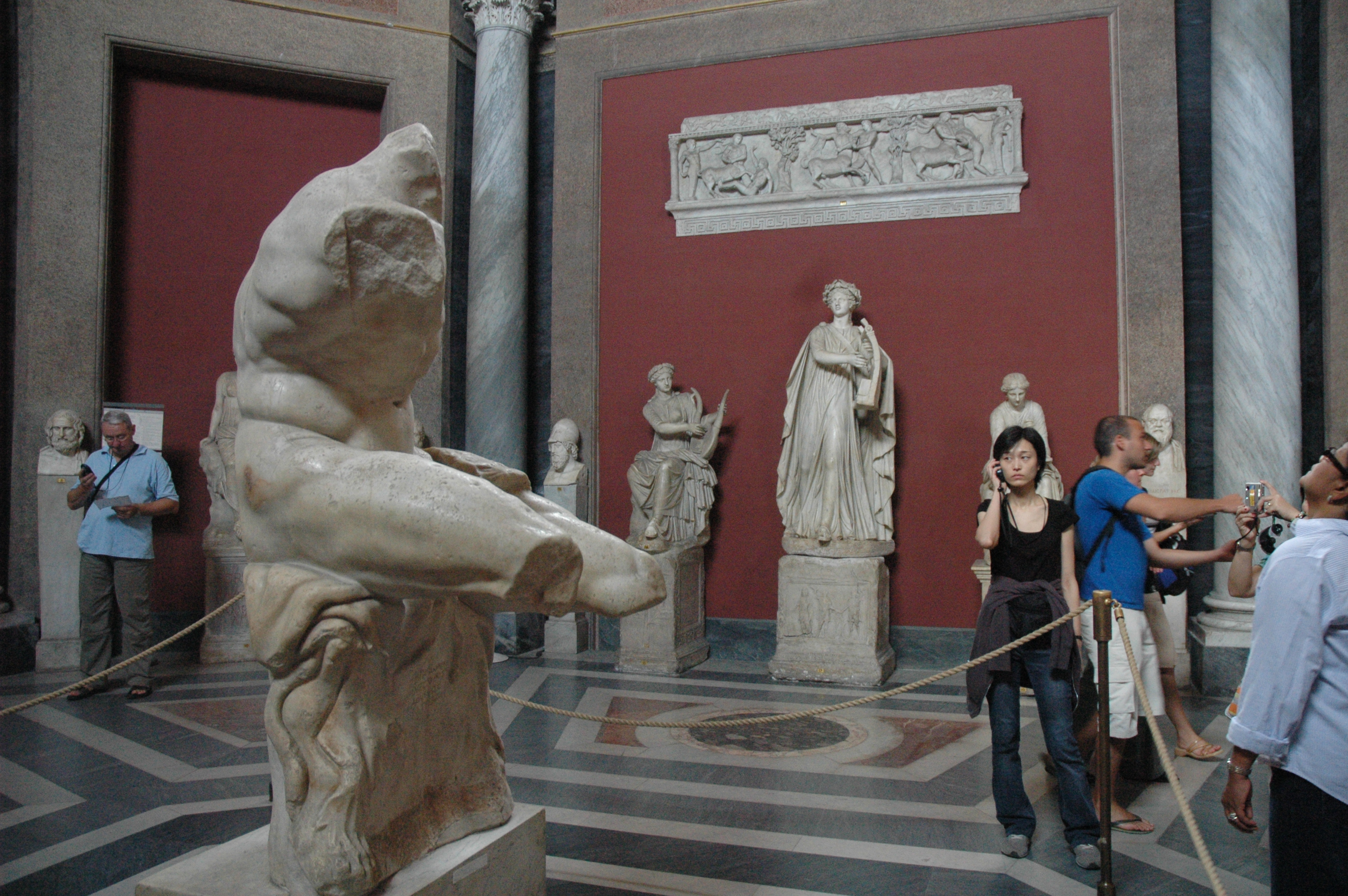
Belvedere Torso, right side view

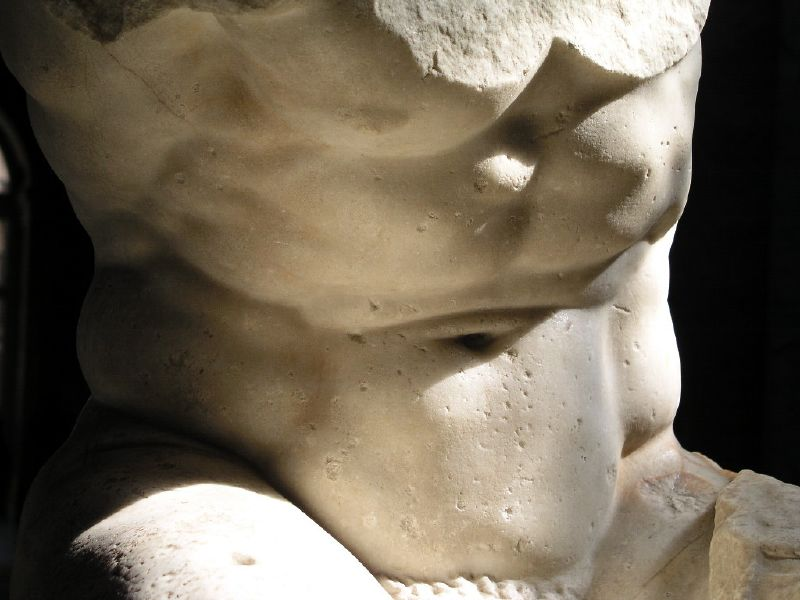
Belvedere Torso detail, abdomen

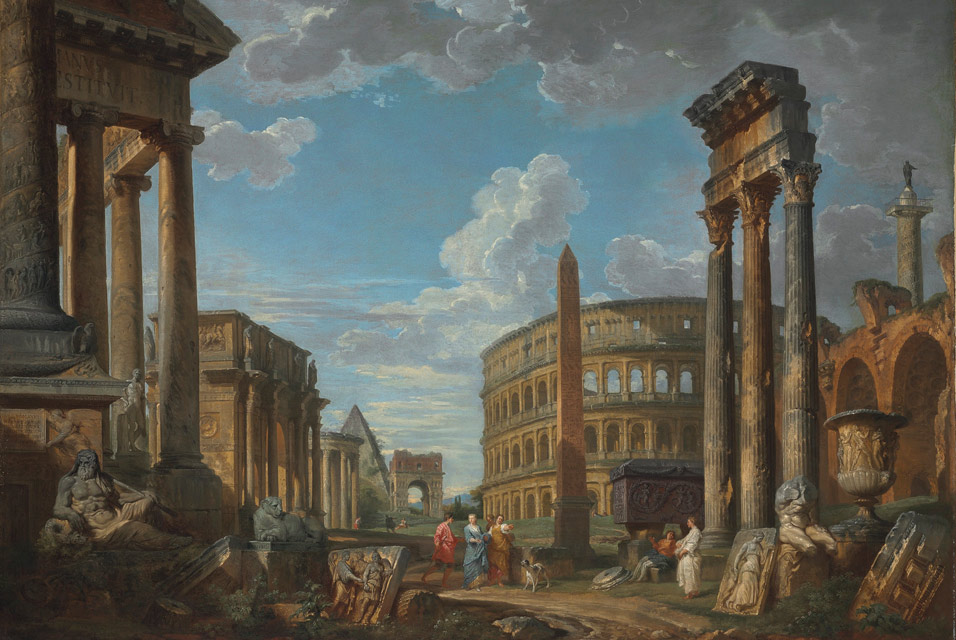
Belvedere Torso (foreground at right) in a capriccio by Giovanni Paolo Panini.

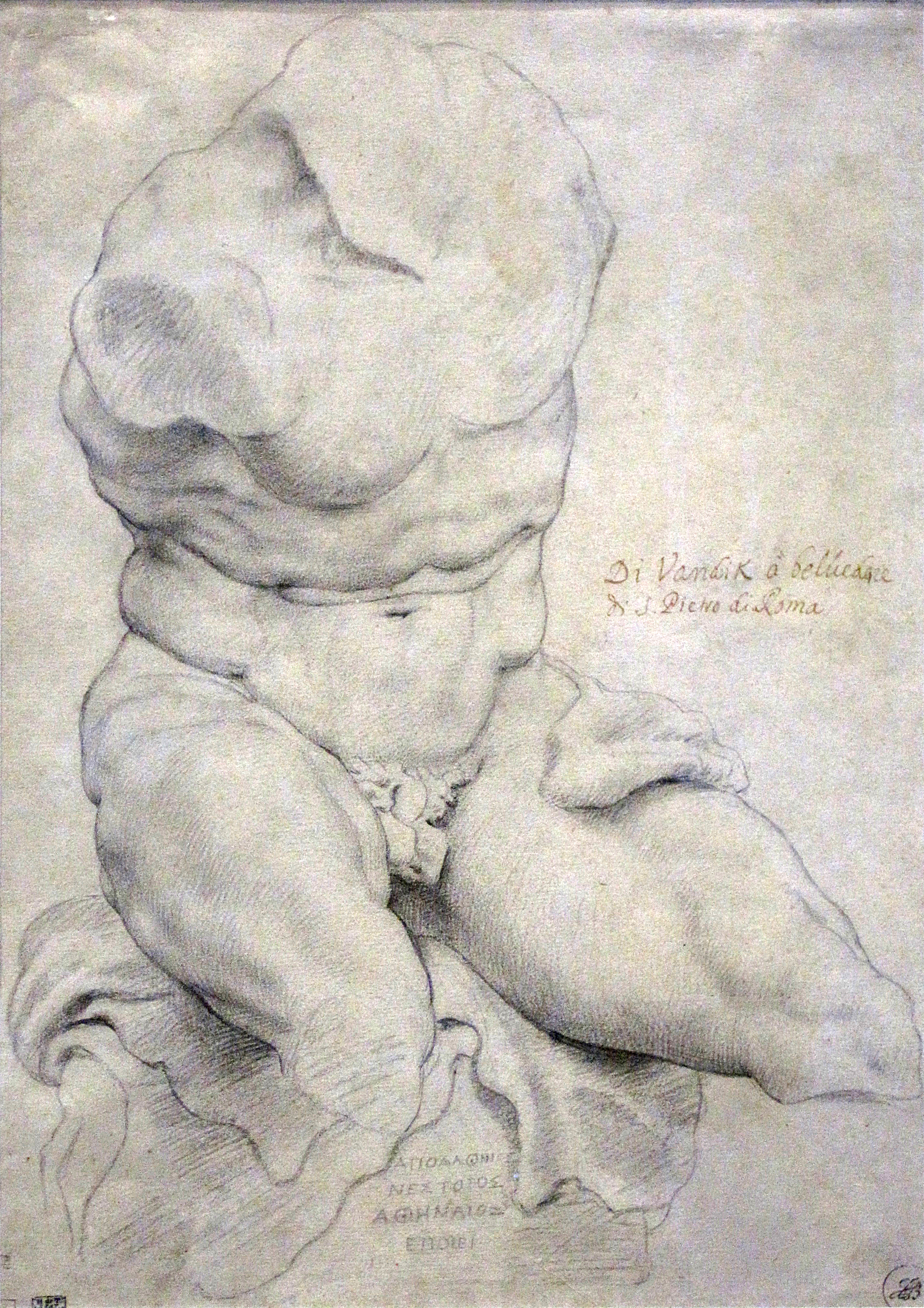
Drawing after the Belvedere Torso by Peter Paul Rubens, Rubenshuis (RH.S.109).

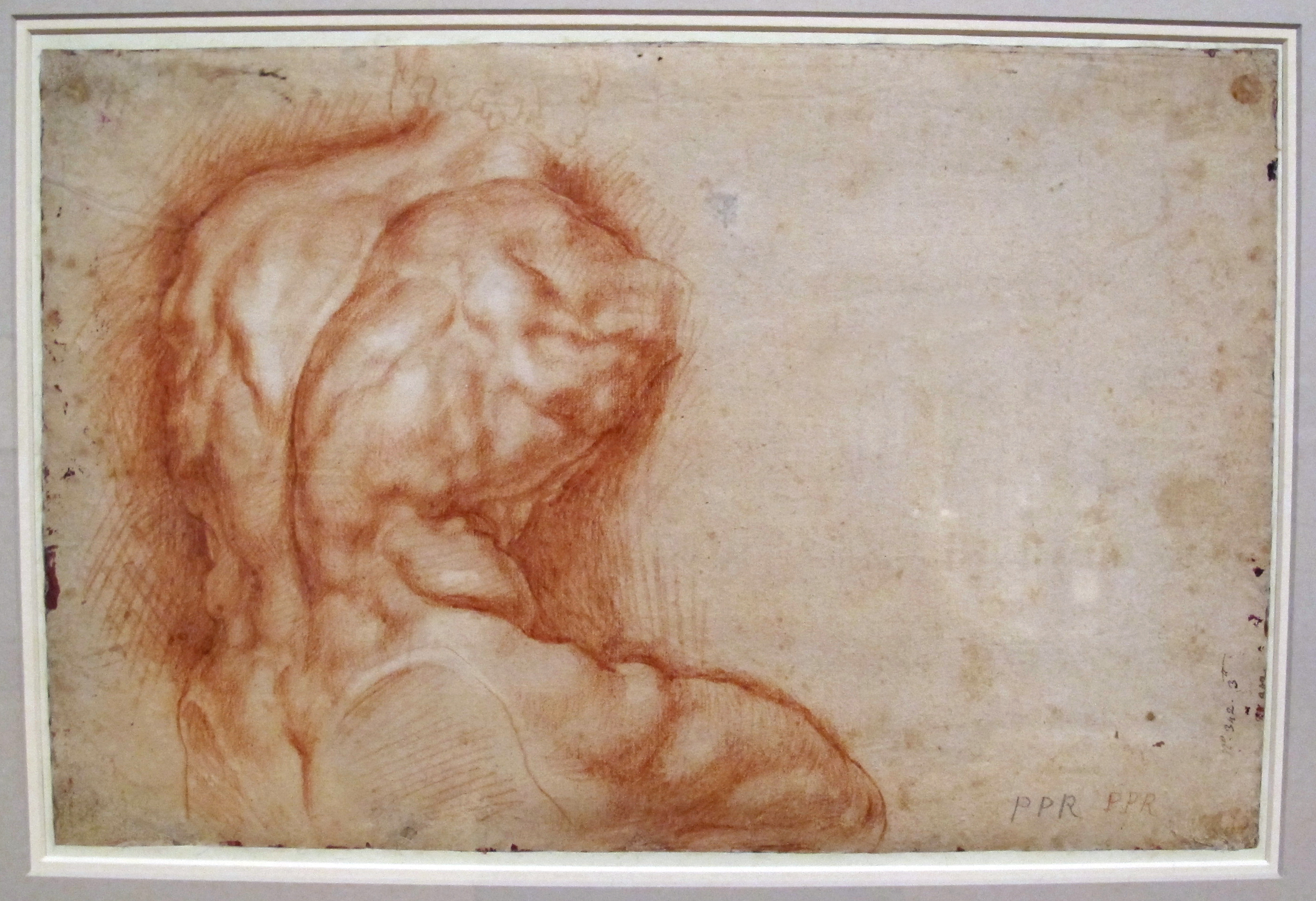
Study after the Belevedere Torso by Peter Paul Rubens, Metropolitan Museum of Art.

Print of the Belvedere Torso; Domenico De Rossi, Raccolta del Scultore Antiche e Moderne. 1704. Engraving. Plate IX. 28 × 29 cm.

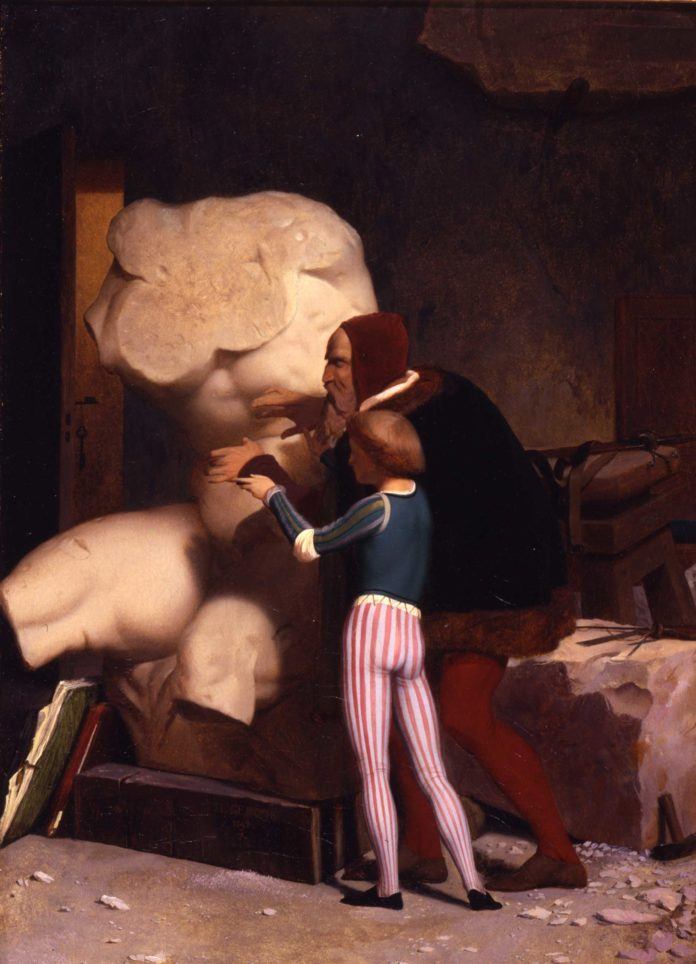
Michelangelo being Shown the Belvedere Torso, Jean-Léon Gérôme, 1849. Dahesh Museum of Art.
