= Cortile del Belvedere =

Architectural work at the Vatican Palace in Rome

- City square
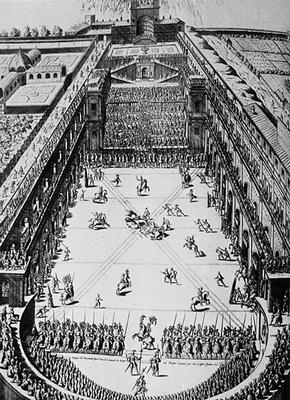
- A carousel in the Cortile del Belvedere, 1565: Étienne du Perac has exaggerated the vertical dimensions, but Bramante's sequence of monumental axially-planned stairs is visible.
- Location: Rome, Italy
- Click on the map for a fullscreen view
- Coordinates: 41°54′15″N 12°27′17″E

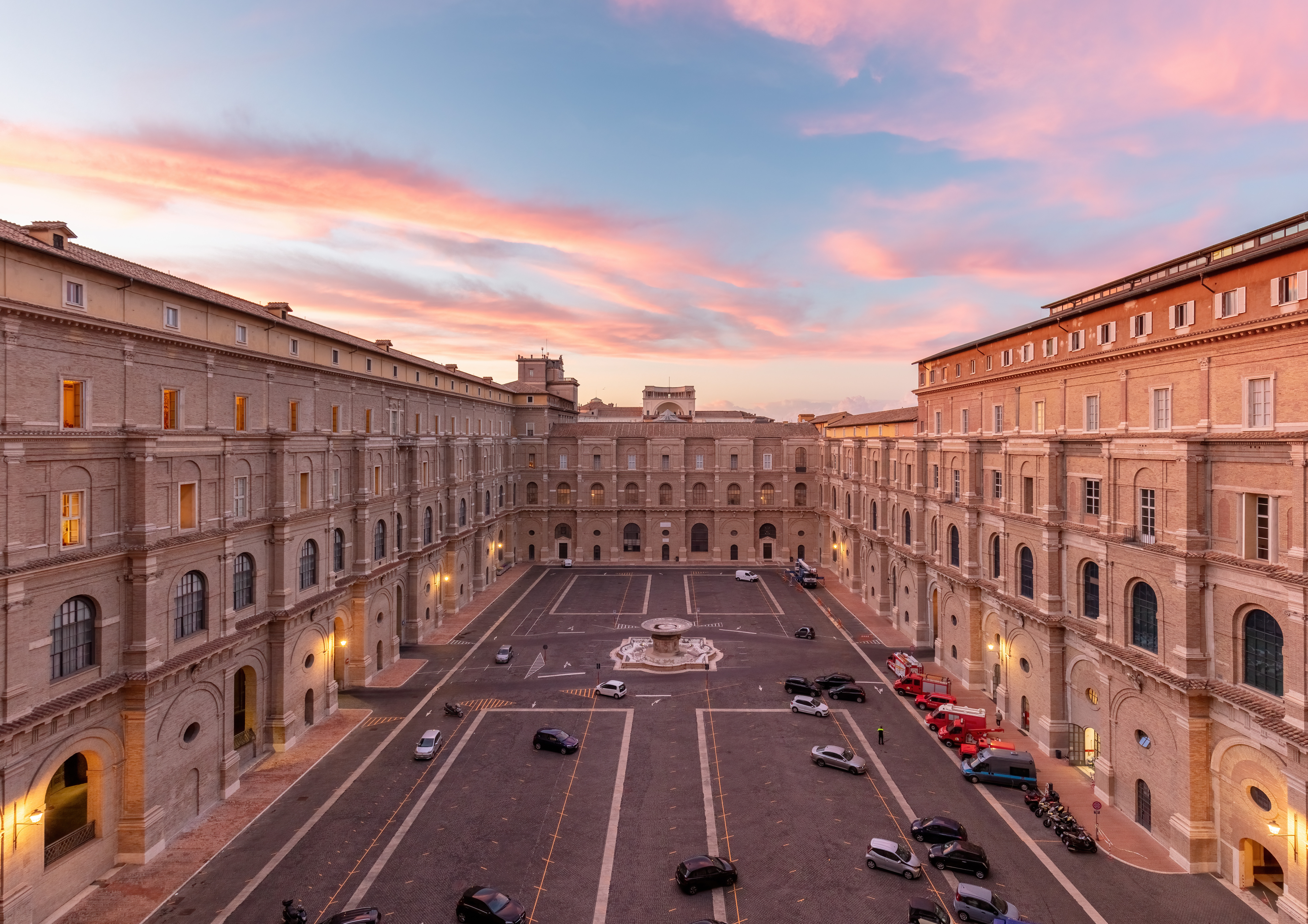
View of the courtyard at dusk

The Cortile del Belvedere (Belvedere Courtyard or Belvedere Court) was a major architectural work of the High Renaissance at the Vatican Palace in Rome. Designed by Donato Bramante from 1505 onward, its concept and details reverberated in courtyard design, formalized piazzas and garden plans throughout Western Europe. Conceived as a single enclosed space, the long Belvedere court connected the Vatican Palace with the Villa Belvedere in a series of terraces connected by stairs, and was contained on its sides by narrow wings.

Bramante did not see the work completed, and before the end of the sixteenth century it had been irretrievably altered by a building across the court, dividing it into two separate courtyards.

== Early history and Bramante's design ==
Innocent VIII began construction of the Villa Belvedere on the high ground overlooking old St Peter's Basilica, in 1484. Here, where the breezes could tame the Roman summer, he had the Florentine architect Antonio del Pollaiuolo, design and complete by 1487 a little summerhouse, which also had views to the east of central Rome and north to the pastures beyond the Castel Sant'Angelo (the Prati di Castello). This villa suburbana was the first pleasure house to be built in Rome since Antiquity.

When Pope Julius II came to the throne in 1503, he moved his growing collection of Roman sculpture here, to an enclosed courtyard within the Villa Belvedere itself. Soon after its discovery, Julius purchased the ancient sculpture of Laocoön and His Sons and brought it here by 1506. A short time later, the statue of Apollo became part of the collection, henceforth to be known as the Apollo Belvedere, as did the heroic male torso known as the Belvedere Torso.

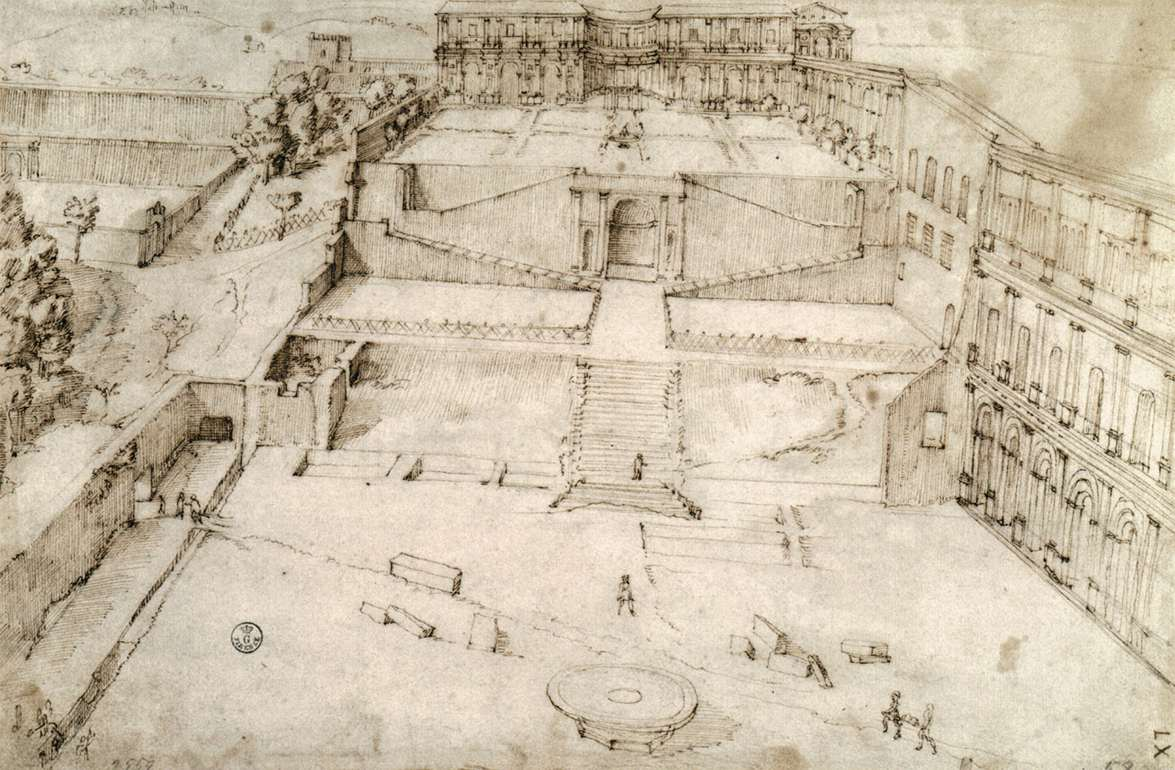
Giovanni Antonio Dosio's drawing of Bramante's building, 1550

Julius commissioned Bramante to link the Vatican Palace with the Villa Belvedere. Bramante's design is commemorated in a fresco at the Castel Sant'Angelo; he regularized the slope as a set of terraces, linked by rigorously symmetrical stairs on the central longitudinal axis, to create a sequence of formal spaces that was unparalleled in Europe, both in its scale and in its architectural unity.

A series of six narrow terraces at the base was traversed by a monumental central stair leading to the wide middle terrace. The divided stair to the uppermost terrace, with flights running on either side against the retaining wall to a landing and returning towards the center, was another innovation by Bramante. His long corridor-like wings that enclose the Cortile now house the Vatican Museums collections. One of the wings accommodated the Vatican Library. The wings have three storeys in the lower court and end in a single one enclosing the uppermost terrace.

The whole visual scenography culminated in the semicircular exedra at the Villa Belvedere end of the court. This was set into a screening wall devised by Bramante to disguise the fact the villa facade was not parallel to the facing Vatican Palace facade at the other end. The entire perspectivised ensemble was designed to be best seen from Raphael's Stanze in the papal apartments of the palace.

== Subsequent history ==
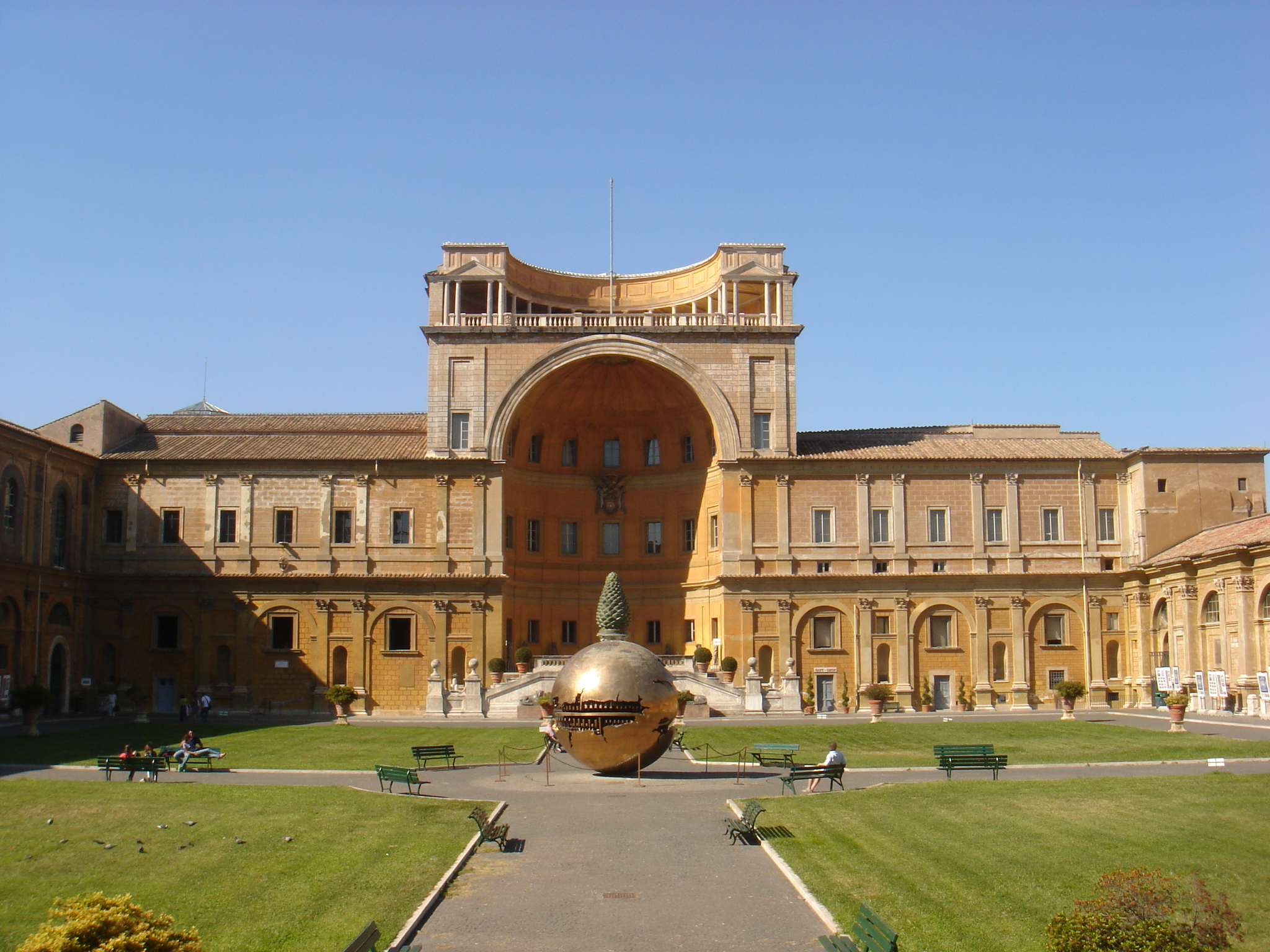
Exedra in the Cortile della Pigna

Shortly after, the court was home to the papal menagerie. It was on the lower part of the courtyard that Pope Leo X would parade his prized elephant Hanno for adoring crowds to see. Because of the pachyderm's glorious history he was buried in the Cortile del Belvedere.

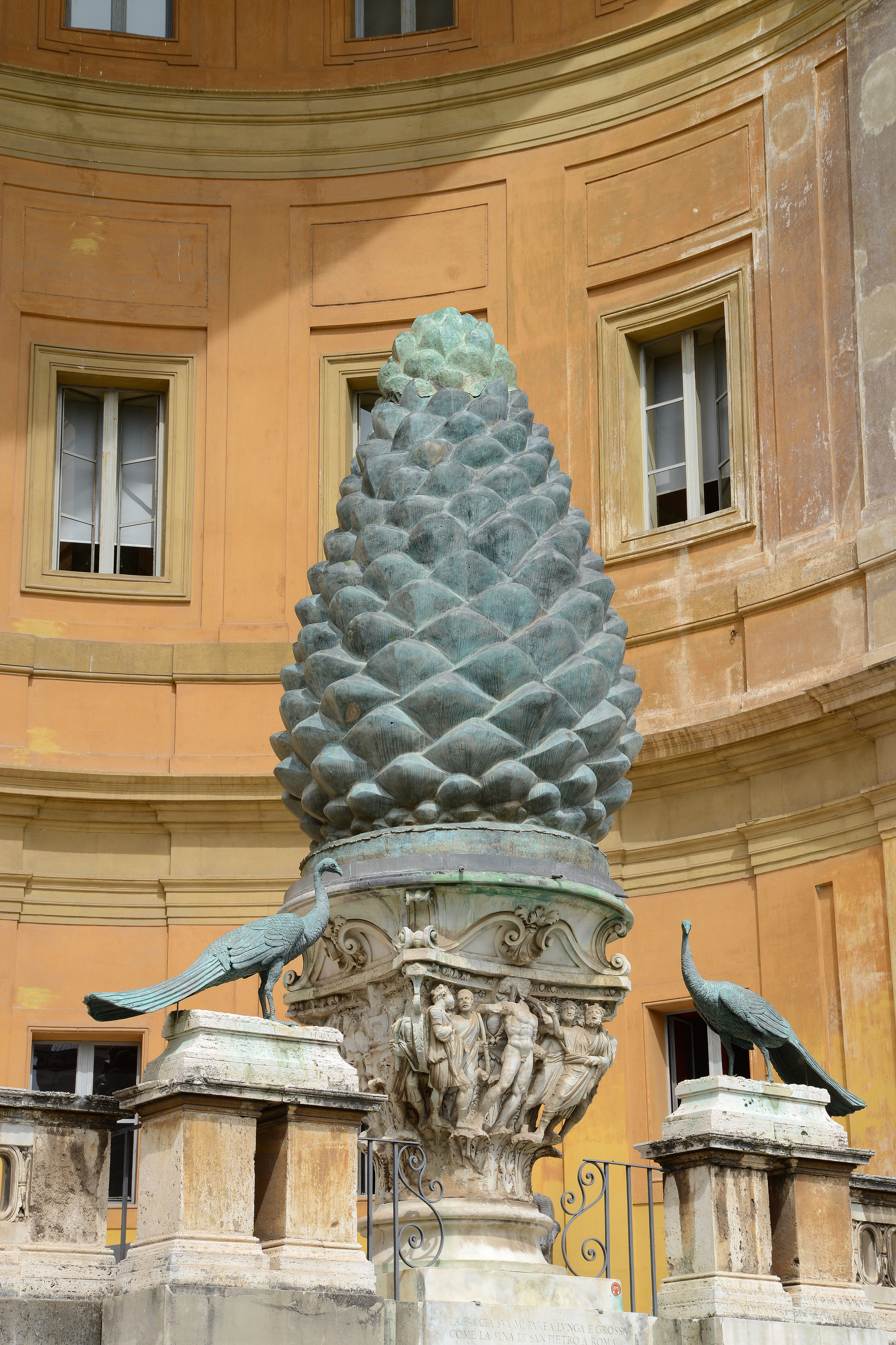
This 1st-century Roman bronze Pigna (pinecone) in front of the exhedra, gives the name Cortile della Pigna to the highest terrace; it was an ancient fountain.

The court was incomplete when Bramante died in 1514. It was finished by Pirro Ligorio for Pius IV in 1562–65. To the great open-headed exedra at the end of the uppermost terrace, Ligorio added a third story, enclosing the central space with a vast half-dome to form the largest niche that had been erected since antiquity— the nicchione ("great niche") visible today from several elevated outlooks around Rome. He completed his structure with an uppermost loggia that repeated the hemicycle of the niche and took its cue from scholarly reconstructions of the ancient sanctuary dedicated to Fortuna Primigenia at Praeneste, south of Rome.

The lowest, and largest level of the court was not planted. It was cobbled and paved with a saltire of stones laid corner to corner and had semi-permanent bleachers set against the Vatican walls to serve for outdoor entertainments, pageants and carousels such as the festive early-17th-century joust depicted in a painting in Museo di Roma, Palazzo Braschi. The upper two levels were laid out with of patterned parterres that the Italians referred to as compartimenti, set in wide graveled walkways. The four sections (now grassed) of the upper courtyard have the same pattern that appears in 16th-century engravings.

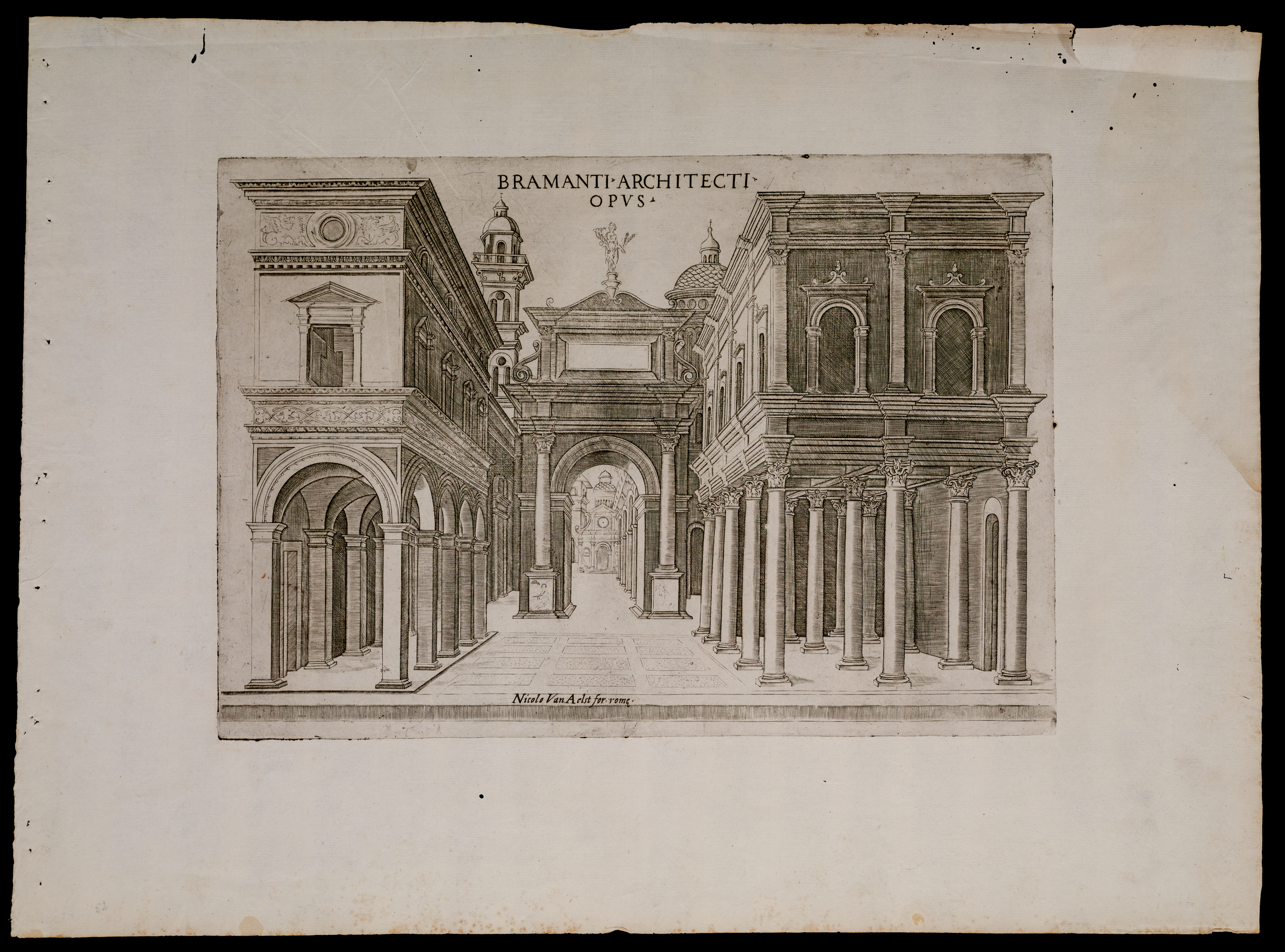
Architectural view of tiered arcades flanking an archway and courtyard, possibly a portion of the Cortile del Belvedere at the Vatican Palace in Rome; designed by Donato Bramante.

Sixtus V spoiled the unity of the Cortile (1585–90) by erecting a wing of the Vatican Library, which occupies the former middle terrace and bisects the space. James Ackerman has suggested that the move was a conscious one, designed to screen the secular, even pagan nature of the Cortile and the collection of sculptures that Pope Adrian VI had referred to as "idols". Today the lowest terrace is still called the Cortile del Belvedere, but the separated upper terrace is called the Cortile della Pigna after the Pigna, a large bronze pinecone, mounted in the niccione, likely to have been the finial of Hadrian's tomb or, as supposed in the Middle Ages, to mark the turning point for chariots in the hippodrome where many Christians were martyred.

In 1990, a sculpture of two concentric spheres by Arnaldo Pomodoro was placed in the middle of the upper courtyard.

== See also ==
- Belvedere (structure)
- Italian Renaissance garden
- Index of Vatican City-related articles
