= Terebinth of Nero =

Former mausoleum in Rome

Terebinthus Neronis
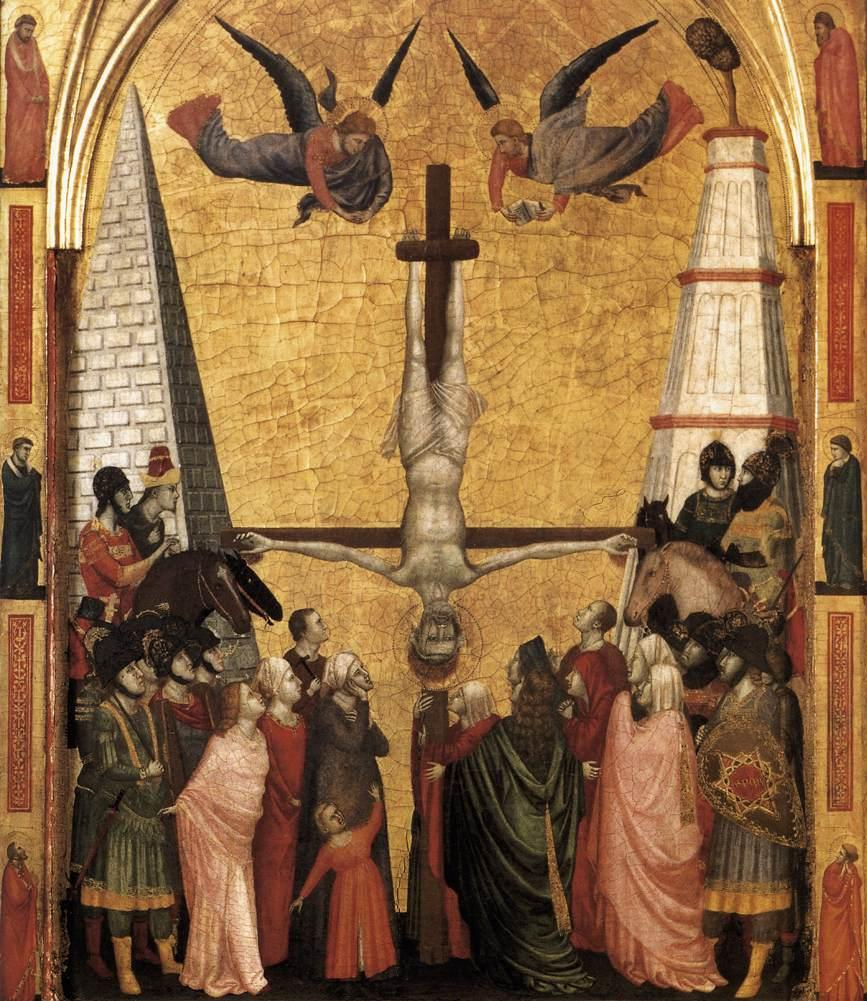
- The Terebinthus Neronis (on the right) depicted in the Stefaneschi Triptych by Giotto

- Location within Rome
- 41°54′09.576″N 12°27′48.990″E
- Type: Roman Mausoleum
- Location: Ager Vaticanus

The Terebinth of Nero (Latin: Terebinthus Neronis; also named Tiburtinum Neronis or Obeliscus Neronis in Latin) was a mausoleum built in ancient Rome that is important for historical, religious and architectural reasons. By the 14th century, it was almost completely demolished.

== Location ==
The mausoleum was located in today's Borgo district of Rome, between old Saint Peter's Basilica in the Vatican and the Mausoleum of Hadrian. Its foundations have been discovered under the first north block of via della Conciliazione, which now includes the Auditorium Conciliazione and the Palazzo Pio. This would place it north of the Meta Romuli.

== History ==
The Terebinthus Neronis was a monumental burial erected in the Roman age on the right bank of the Tiber, near the intersection of two Roman roads, the Via Cornelia and the Via Triumphalis, in an area outside the pomerium (the religious boundary around Rome); this area, named Ager Vaticanus, hosted at that time numerous cemetery areas such as the nearby Vatican Necropolis and, due to its proximity to the Campus Martius represented an ideal area to build the monumental tombs of the members of the Roman upper class. It lay next to another large mausoleum, the so-called Meta Romuli, a pyramid which was demolished in 1499 by Pope Alexander VI (r. 1492–1503). The Terebinthus Neronis is supposed to have had a circular plan and the shape of a giant tumulus tomb. While both monuments survived the great changes due to the construction of the old St. Peter's Basilica, the former was destroyed already during the Middle Ages, while the latter survived until the Renaissance age becoming an important element of Rome's topography.

The first mention of the Terebinth is by Benedictus Canonicus Sancti Petri (c. 1144), which names it "obeliscus Neronis", and by the Mirabilia Urbis Romae (a 12th-century guide of the city), where it is described like a circular monument composed with two superimposed cylinders (like Castel Sant'Angelo) lined with marble slabs and it is called Tiburtinum Neronis; the name Tiburtinum derives from the material of its revetment, the travertine (lapis tiburtinus, that is from the city of Tivoli in Latin), while the name Neronis ("of Nero" in Latin) is typical of many toponyms and names of monuments of the Vatican area (like prata Neronis, pons Neronis, etc.).

The Name Terebinthus originates from a passage in the Naturalis Historia of Pliny the Elder which writes that in a place in the Ager Vaticanus grew a large terebinth tree (a tree belonging to the family of the Anacardiaceae). According to the religious tradition Saint Peter was buried under a terebinth, and due to the assonance between the two words terebinthus and tiburtinum Pietro Mallio, canon of Saint Peter, around 1180 named the monument Terebinthus, moving the place of the crucifixion of Saint Peter at the top of today's via della Conciliazione.

The identification between tree and monument implied that the site of the martyrdom of Saint Peter was placed either between the Terebinthus and the Meta Romuli, or between the latter and the obelisk of the Circus of Nero (and in some medieval description the monument itself is named "obelisk of Nero"), or in the mid-point between the two pyramids (ad Terebinthus inter duas metas...in Vaticano) and consequently the Terebinthus (either as monument or as tree) was for a long time a popular subject in the depictions of Saint Peter's martyrdom and in the representations of the city in the Middle Ages.

Some examples are the Stefaneschi Polyptych by Giotto; a polyptych by Jacopo di Cione; one tile of Filarete's Bronze Doors in Old St. Peter's Basilica; the frescoes on the vaults of the Basilica of San Francesco in Assisi by Cimabue; and possibly the fresco of The Vision of the Cross in Raphael's Rooms in the Vatican.

According to the Mirabilia the terebinth too, like the nearby meta Romuli, lost very soon its stone revetment, used to pave the quadriporticus and the stairs of Saint Peter's church; in its description of the monument the anonymous writer uses the past tense, implying that at his time (12th century) the monument had been already partially destroyed. The terebinth survived until the 14th century.

== Description ==
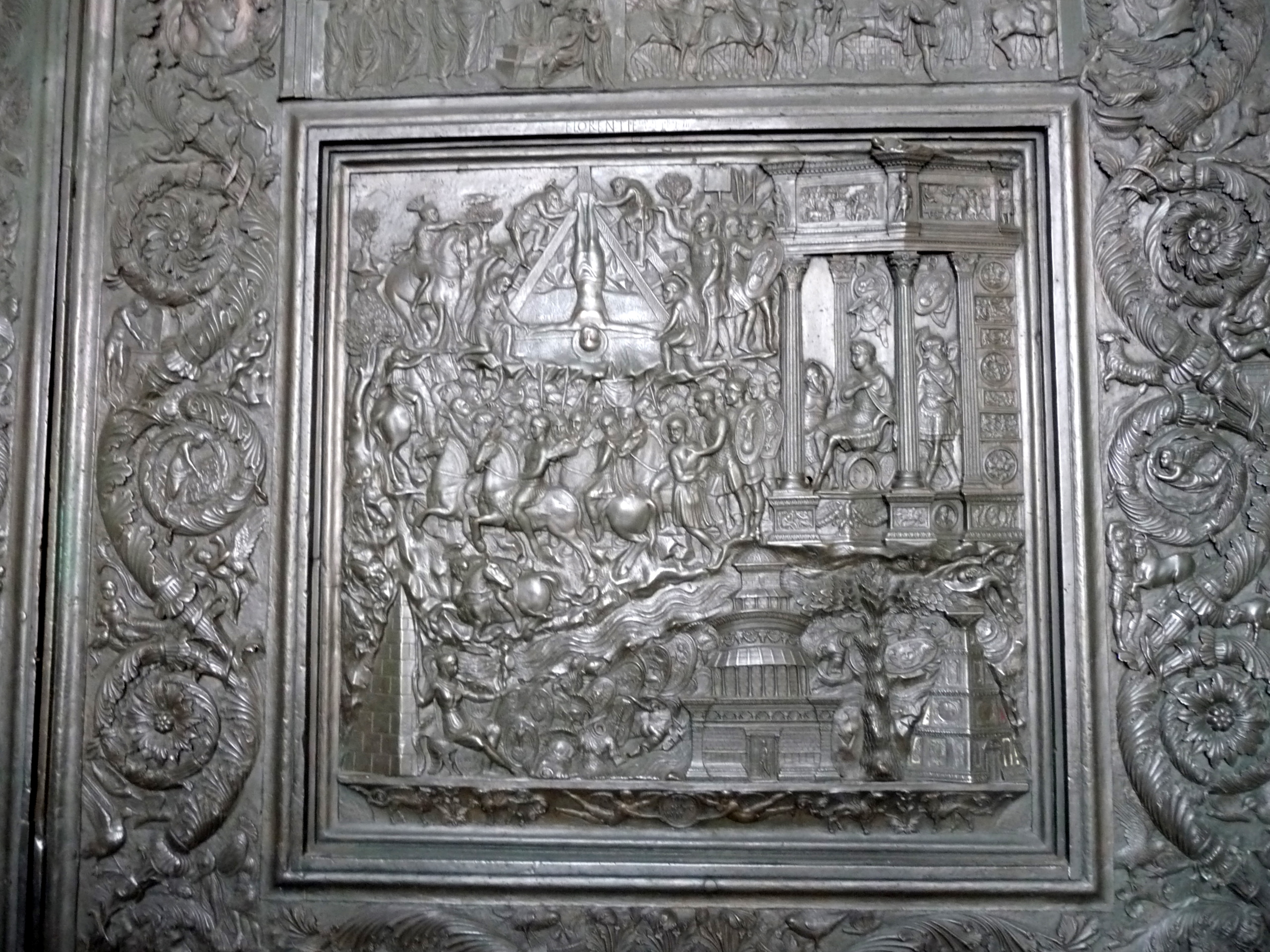
The terebinth tree (in the lower right) between Castel Sant'Angelo and the Meta Romuli (with the Pyramid of Cestius in the lower left) in a tile of Filarete's Bronze doors in Saint Peter

The medieval guides describe the terebinthus as a very tall structure (comparable with the Castrum Crescentii, that is Hadrian's Mausoleum), with a circular plan and two elements (like a castrum). Unfortunately, due to the vagueness of their descriptions, all the depictions of the monument (by Giotto, Cimabue, etc.) have very little in common with its real appearance Based on the Medieval descriptions, it has been hypothesized that the terebinthus was a tomb of tumulus type, like the so-called tomb of the Curiatii at the beginning of the 6th mile of the Appian Way; In this case, the circular monument was composed of a large plinth tiled with travertine; above it, there was a tumulus of earth surmounted with a cylinder in masonry. On top of it, towered the statue of the defunct or a memorial stone.

In 1948–49, during the works for the construction of the first block of the north side of Via della Conciliazione, several semicircular stone blocks carved by a 8 cm deep groove accompanied by symmetrical double dovetail recesses came to light. They belonged either to the drain at the base of the monument, or to the plinth covering; in the latter case, the groove with dovetail recesses has to be interpreted as the interlocking of a balustrade. Depending on the hypothesis, the terebinth had a diameter of 20 m (in the former case) or of 22 m (in the latter case). The location of the terebinth resulting from the excavations of 1948–49, northwest of the Meta Romuli, is in contradiction with that given by all the middle age descriptions, which say that the monument lay northeast of the pyramid.

== Sources ==
- Castagnoli, Ferdinando; Cecchelli, Carlo; Giovannoni, Gustavo; Zocca, Mario (1958). Topografia e urbanistica di Roma (in Italian). Bologna: Cappelli.
- Coarelli, Filippo (1974). Guida archeologica di Roma (in Italian). Milano: Arnoldo Mondadori Editore. ISBN 978-8804118961.
- Gigli, Laura (1990). Guide rionali di Roma (in Italian). Vol. Borgo (I). Roma: Fratelli Palombi Editori. ISSN 0393-2710.
- Petacco, Laura (2016). "La Meta Romuli e il Terebinthus Neronis". In Claudio Parisi Presicce; Laura Petacco (eds.). La Spina: dall’Agro vaticano a via della Conciliazione (in Italian). Rome: Gangemi. ISBN 978-88-492-3320-9.
