= Septemvir =

In ancient Rome, a septemvir was one of seven men appointed to execute a commission. The term septemviri was used to refer to such a commission collectively. Seven-man commissions were appointed to serve both secular and religious purposes. One of the most significant religious groups in Rome was the septemviri Epulones, a college of priests who prepared the feasts in honour of the gods.

== See also ==
- Triumvirate
- Decemviri
