= Tomb of Hilarus Fuscus =

Funerary monument southeast of Rome, Italy

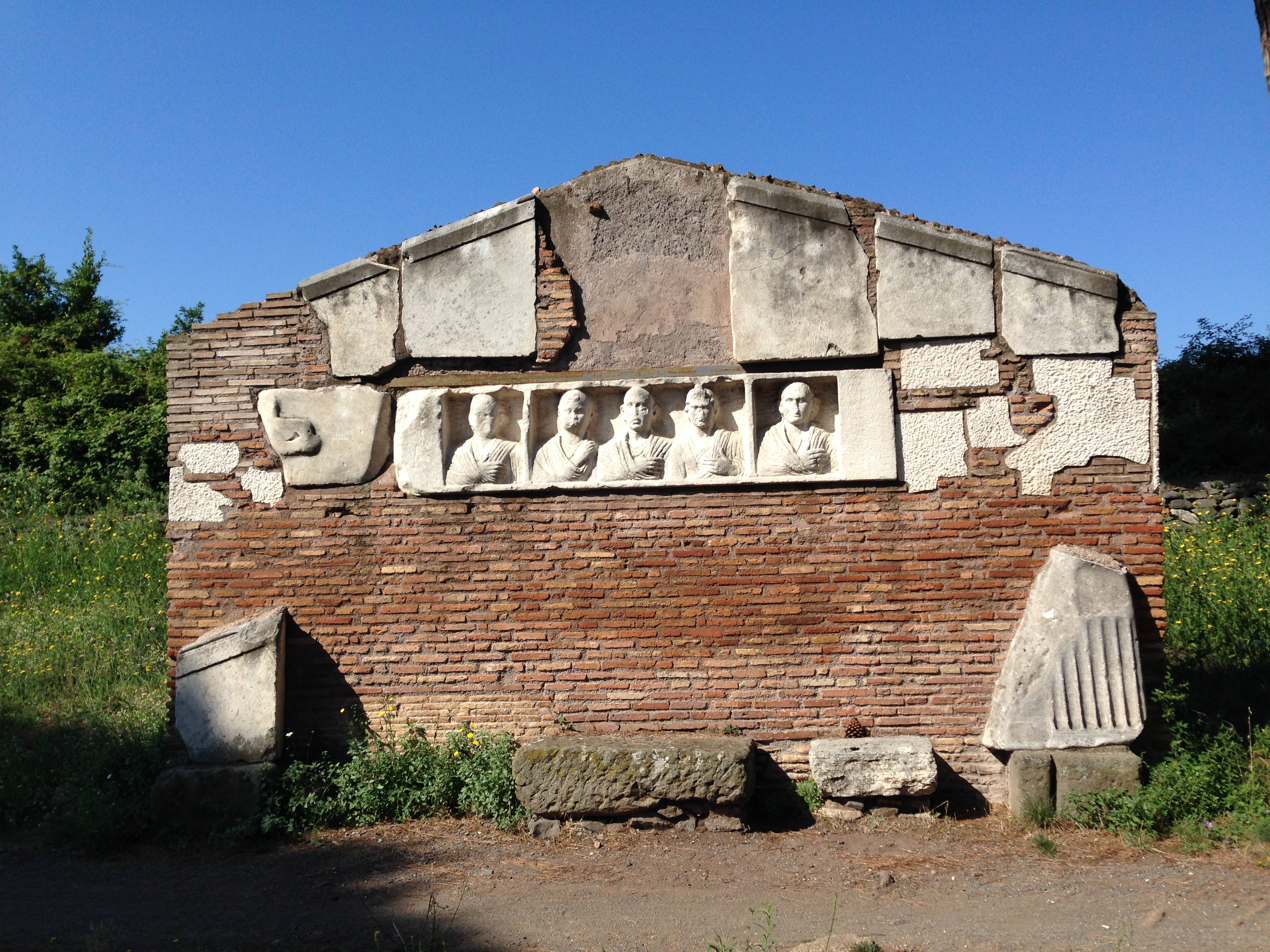
- Tomb of Hilarus Fuscus
- Interactive map of Tomb of Hilarus Fuscus
- 41°50′17″N 12°32′11″E

The Tomb of Hilarus Fuscus (Latin: Hilarus Fuscus or Hilarius Fuscus) is a funerary monument located near the fourth mile of the Appian Way or Via Appia Antica, to the southeast of Rome.

== History ==
The tomb was restored by Luigi Canina in the mid-1800s. An inscription bearing the names of those represented on the masonry disappeared in the period between 1978 and 1998. The sculptures are copies: the originals are now in the National Museum of the Baths of Diocletian.

== Architecture ==
The architecture of the tomb and the analysis of figures (particularly the hairstyle of the women) suggests the tomb was built at end of the Republican period, the beginning of the Imperial age (circa 30 BC).

The tomb is mentioned in the Émile Zola novel Roma published in 1896.

Preceded by Tomb of Eurysaces the Baker	Landmarks of Rome; Tomb of Hilarus Fuscus	Succeeded by Tomb of the Scipios
