= Stefaneschi Triptych =

Painting by Giotto

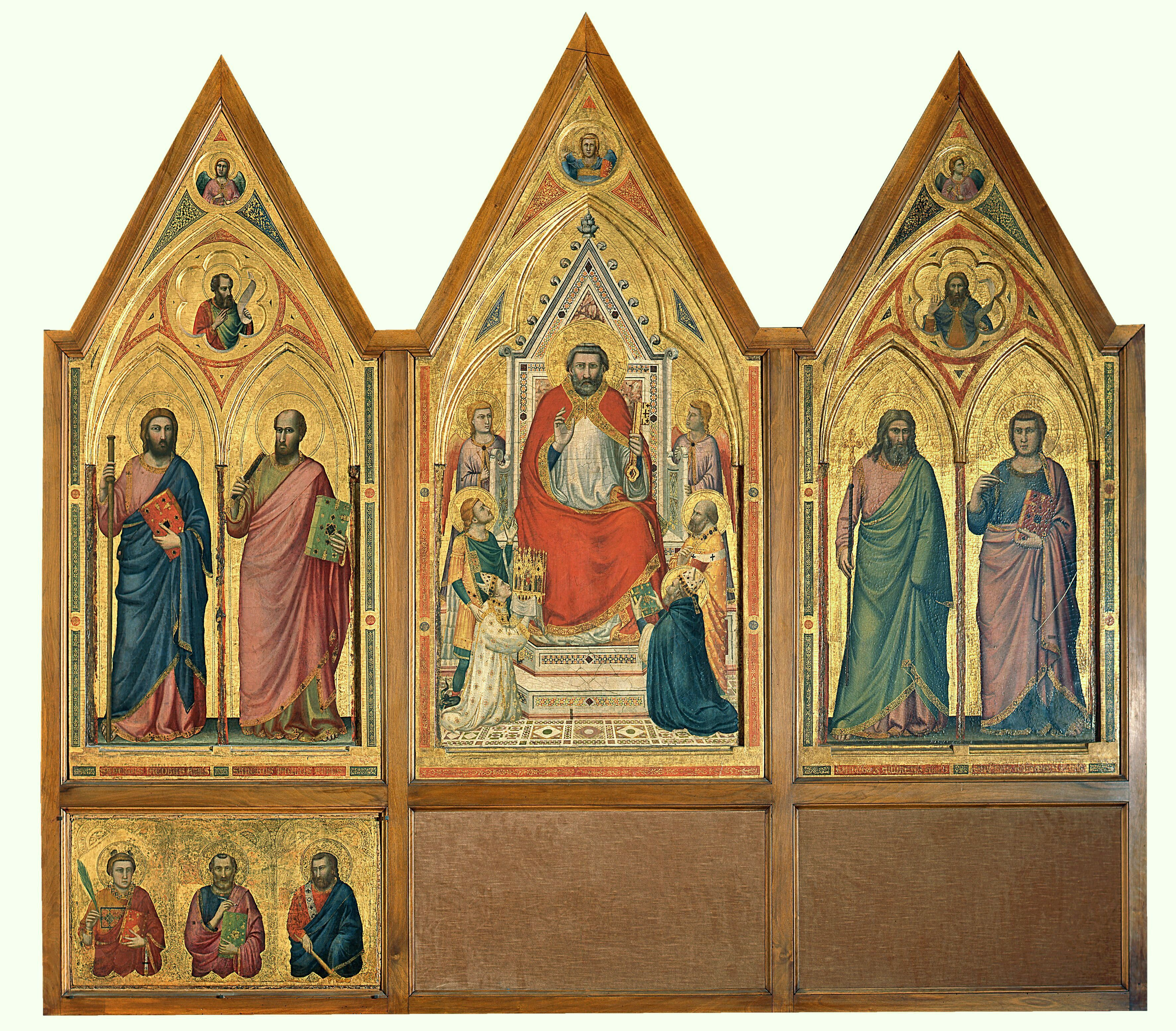
Front side. Tempera on wood. cm 178 × 89 (central panel); cm 168 × 83 c. (side panels); cm 45 c. × 83 c. (each section of the predella)

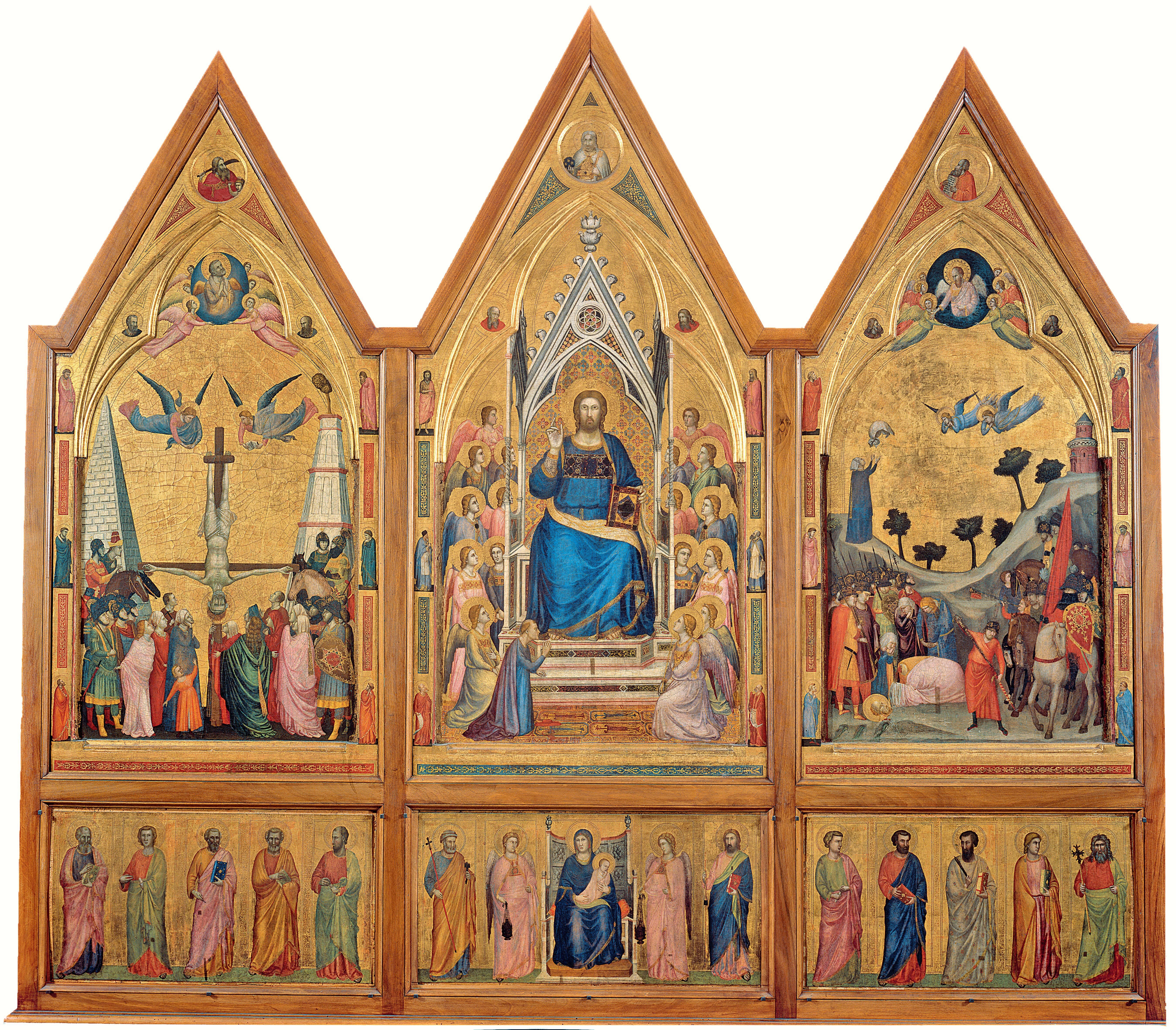
Back side. Tempera on wood. cm 178 × 89 (central panel); cm 168 × 83 c. (side panels); cm 45 c. × 83 c. (each section of the predella)

The Stefaneschi Altarpiece is a triptych by the Italian painter Giotto, from c. 1320. It was commissioned by Cardinal Giacomo Gaetani Stefaneschi to serve as an altarpiece for one of the altars of Old St. Peter's Basilica in Rome. It is now at the Pinacoteca Vaticana, in Rome.

== Description ==
It is a rare example in Giotto's work of a documented commission, and includes Giotto's signature, although the date, like most dates for Giotto, is disputed, and many scholars feel the artist's workshop was responsible for its execution. It had long been thought to have been made for the main altar of the church; more recent research suggests that it was placed on the "canon's altar", located in the nave, just to the left of the huge arched opening into the transept. The altar was freestanding, and the altarpiece is painted on both sides so it could be seen by the congregation from the front and the canons of the church from the back.

The central front panel represents Saint Peter enthroned, flanked by saints, with Cardinal Stefaneschi himself kneeling at Peter's right offering up this altarpiece in reduced size. Saints James and Paul are in the left panel and John the Evangelist and Andrew are on the right. Two of the three predella panels are lost, but they surely all represented half-length figures of saints. The back main (central) panel represents Christ enthroned flanked by angels with a kneeling Cardinal Stefaneschi at his right foot. In the left panel we see the crucifixion of Peter, and on the right is the beheading of St. Paul. The predella depicts the Virgin and Child flanked by angels in the center and standing figures of the 12 apostles at the sides.

The altarpiece stood before the apse of Old St. Peter's, which in the 14th century contained a mosaic of Christ enthroned between Saints. Peter & Paul. Thus the iconography of the front of the painting paralleled the apse mosaic in form but did not repeat it in iconography. The central panel of the back of the altarpiece duplicated the apse mosaic for those who could not see it (because they sat with their backs to it), while the side panels introduced narratives. It was normal for double-sided altarpieces in this period to have an iconic image on the front and narrative images on the back. Peter echoes Christ's pose to emphasize the role of the pope (Peter was the first pope) as Christ's representative on earth.

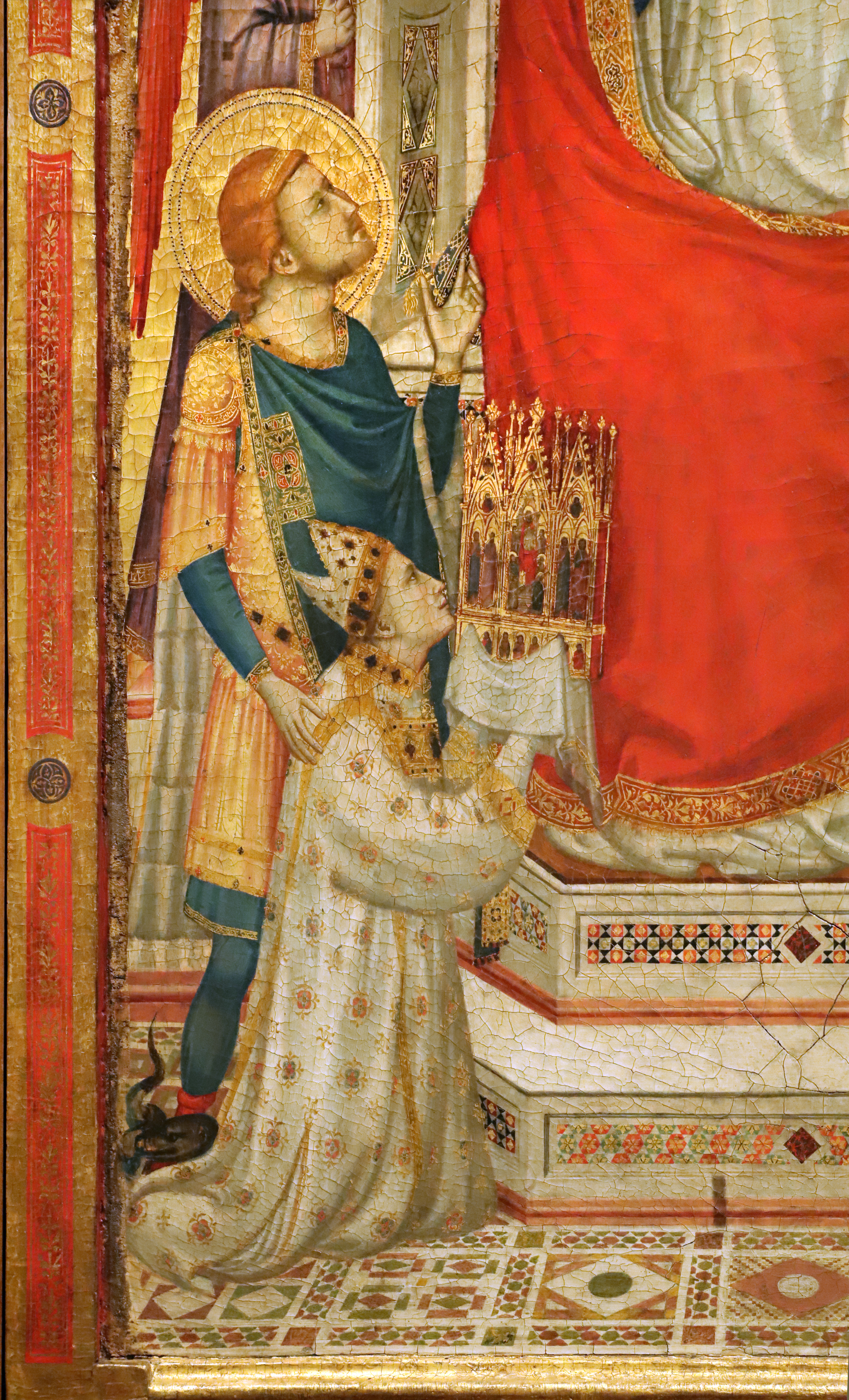
Front detail: Cardinal Giacomo Stefaneschi

Giotto represents the martyrdoms of Peter and Paul as taking place in recognizable locales, frequently visited by pilgrims to Rome. Peter's crucifixion is placed between the Meta Romuli (a pyramid near the Vatican, destroyed in the 15th century) and the Terebinthus Neronis (a classical monument, likely a mausoleum, that no longer exists), while Paul's beheading is outside the city, near a round building that represents the church of San Paolo alle Tre Fontane, the site of the Saint's beheading South of Rome. These scenes could also be found in the medieval frescoes on the walls of the nave of Old St. Peter's. Although images of donors in church decorations in Rome went back to the Early Christian period, Giotto's altarpiece for St. Peter's is unusual in both the double representation of the donor (front and back) and the specificity of the face and costume of Cardinal Stefaneschi. Stefaneschi is dressed in full ceremonial costume as a cardinal on the front, appropriate for the "public" face of the altarpiece and is introduced to St. Peter by St. George. On the back, he is more modestly dressed as a canon, like the audience for this side of the painting. Vasari cited portraiture as one of the greatest strengths of Giotto's art.

The depiction of Stefaneschi holding this very painting suggests that it originally had a significantly more elaborate frame, which would have made the relatively small altarpiece fit better into the large space that was Old St. Peter's. The characteristic of containing a smaller version of itself provides one of the earliest known Renaissance examples of the so-called "Droste effect", common in medieval art.

== Sources ==
- Boskovits, Miklos, "Giotto a Roma", Arte Cristiana, 88 (2000) 171–180.
- Gardner, Julian, "The Stefaneschi Altarpiece: A Reconsideration", Journal of the Warburg and Courtauld Institutes, Vol. 37, (1974), pp. 57–103.
- Gosebruch, M., "Giottos Stefaneschi-Altarwerk aus Alt-St. Peter in Rom", Miscellanea Bibliotecae Hertzianae, Munich, 1961, 101–130.
- von den Haegen, Anne Mueller, Giotto di Bondone, trans. Lena Miller, Cologne, 1998, 80–85.
- Kemp, W., "Zum Program von Stefaneschi-Altar und Navicella", Zeitschrift für Kunstgeschichte, 30 (1967) 309–320.
- Kempers, Bram & Sible de Blauuw. "Jacopo Stefaneschi, Patron and Liturgist: A New Hypothesis Regarding the Date, Iconography, Authorship, and Function of His Altarpiece for Old St. Peter's", Mededelingen van het Nederlands Instituut te Rome 47 (1987) 83–113.
- Kessler, Herbert L., "Giotto e Roma", in Giotto e il Trecento: "Il più Sovrano Maestro stato in dipintura", exh. cat., ed. Alessandro Tomei, Milan, 2009, 85–99.
- Maginnis, Hayden B.J., "Giotto's World through Vasari's Eyes", Zeitschrift für Kunstgeschichte, 56 Bd., H. 3 (1993), pp. 385–408.
- Paoletti, John T. & Gary Radke, Art in Renaissance Italy, 3rd ed., London, 2005.
