= Giacomo Gaetani Stefaneschi =

Catholic cardinal

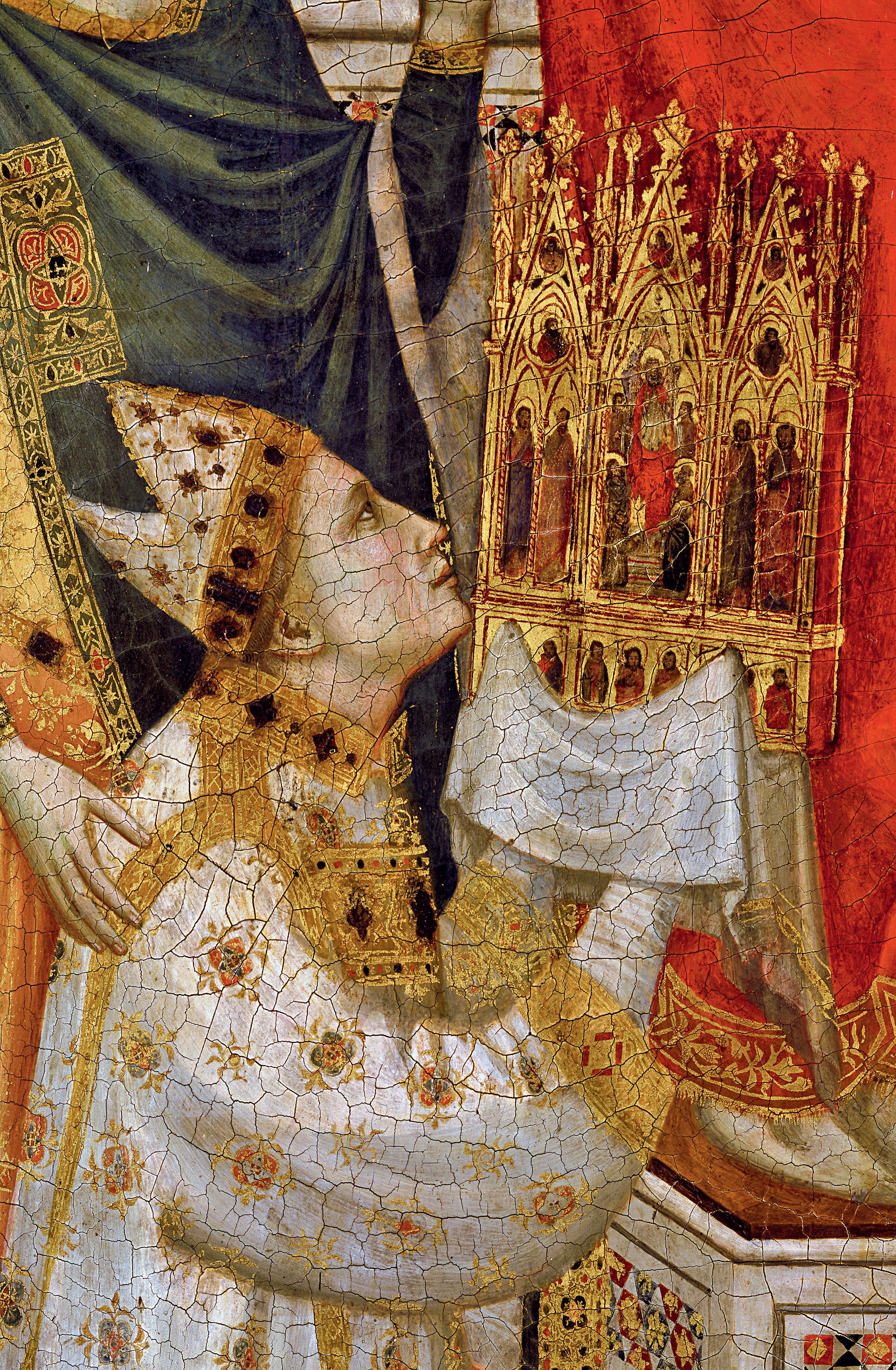
Stefaneschi as depicted in the Stefaneschi Triptych

Giacomo Gaetani Stefaneschi (c. 1270 – 23 June 1343) was an Italian cardinal deacon in the Catholic Church.

== Life ==
Giacomo was the son of the senator Pietro Stefaneschi and his wife, Perna Orsini. He was born in Rome; his birth year is disputed.

Stefaneschi received his early education at Rome, and was sent to the University of Paris to pursue higher studies. After three years he received the degree of Master of Arts, and intended to devote himself to the study of philosophy and Holy Scripture, having already begun to teach at the university, when his parents recalled him to Italy in order that he should study canon and civil law.

Pope Celestine V made Stefaneschi canon of St. Peter's and auditor of the Rota. He was created cardinal-deacon of the titular Church of San Giorgio in Velabro on 17 December 1295 by Pope Boniface VIII, who also sent him as legate to Cesena, Forlì, Faenza and Bologna in 1296 to suppress civil disturbances. Pope John XXII appointed him protector of the Minorites, 23 July 1334. He was never ordained priest.

Stefaneschi died at Avignon on 23 June 1343. He was the last surviving cardinal created by Boniface VIII, having held the cardinalate for more than 47 years.

== Works ==
=== Opus Metricum ===
Stefaneschi is best known as the author of Opus Metricum, the earliest biography of Celestine V. The work is arranged in three parts, composed in dactylic hexameter, and based on Celestine's brief autobiography. The first part, written before Stefaneschi became a cardinal, is a three-volume account of Celestine's election, reign, and abdication. The second part, written five years later, gives an account of the election and coronation of Boniface VIII The final, three-volume part describes Celestine's life after his abdication, his canonization, and various miracles.

In 1319, Stefaneschi united the three parts and sent them, along with a dedicatory epistle, to the prior and the monks of San Spirito at Sulmona, the mother-house of the Celestines. It was published along with a prose introduction giving details on Stefaneschi's life, and first edited by Papebroch, Acta Sanctorum, IV, May, 436-483.

The Catholic Encyclopedia describes Opus Metricum as an important historical resource but "devoid of all literary excellence" and "extremely clumsy and barbarous".

=== Other works ===
The other works of Stefaneschi are:

- Liber de Centesimo sive Jubileo, edited by Quattrocchi in "Bessarione" (1900), an account of the first Roman Jubilee, held in 1300
- Liber ceremoniarum Curiæ Romanæ, a book of ceremonies to be observed at the Roman Court
- Vita S. Georgii Martyris, a hagiography of St. George, the patron of Stefaneschi's titular church
- "Historia de miraculo Mariæ facto Avinione", a short narrative of a young man, condemned to death at Avignon, being miraculously delivered by the Virgin Mary.
