= Tomb of Eurysaces the Baker =

Ancient Roman tomb

Tomb of Marcus Vergilius Eurysaces the baker
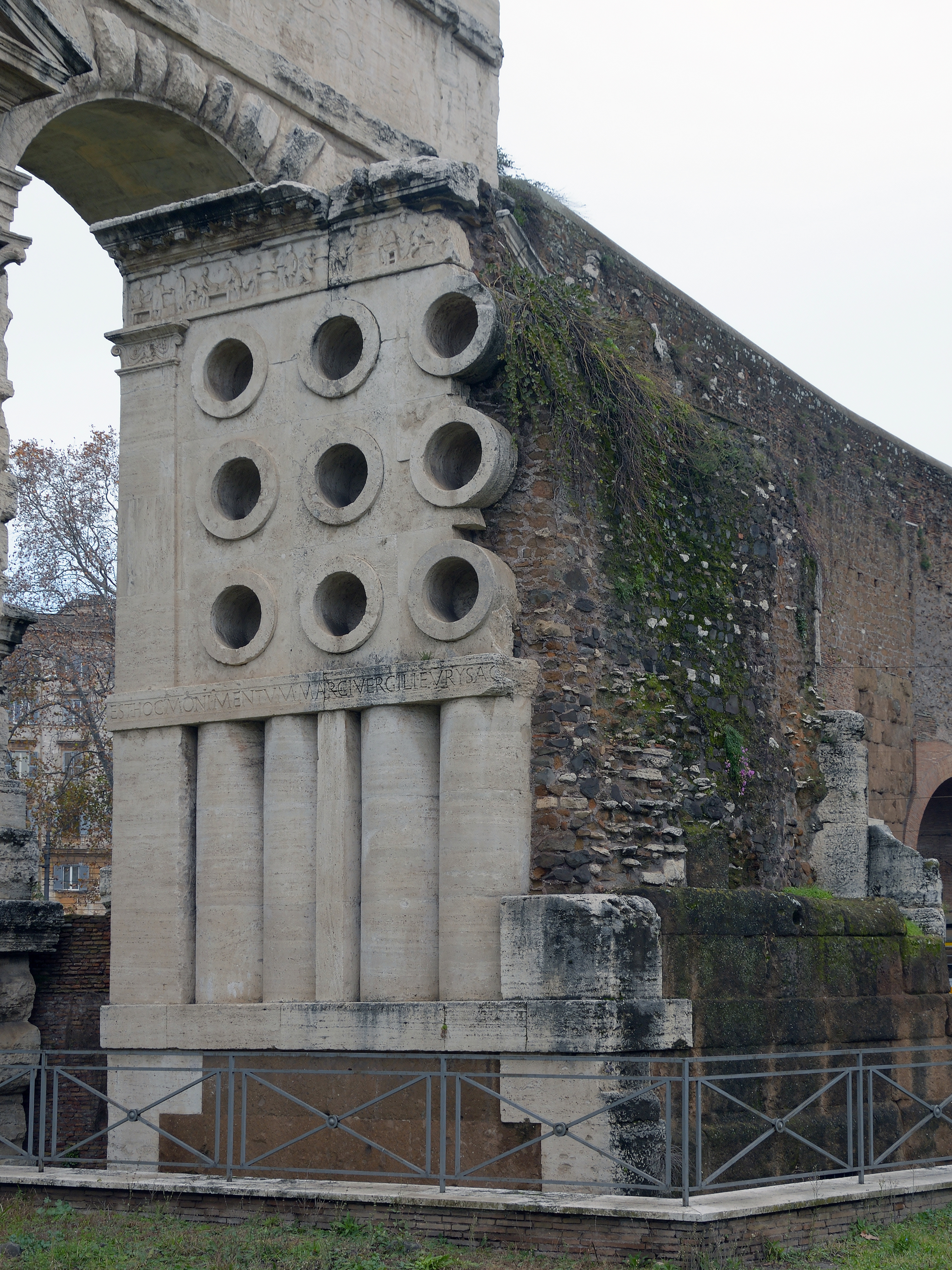
- South facade of the Tomb of Eurysaces outside Porta Maggiore, with the Aqua Claudia behind; the nine cylinders may represent grain measures or mixing vessels

- Location within Rome
- Interactive map of Tomb of Marcus Vergilius Eurysaces the baker
- 41°53′29″N 12°30′55″E
- Type: Funerary monument
- Periods: Late Republican period

History
- Built: c. 50–20 BC
- Built by: Marcus Vergilius Eurysaces

Site notes
- Material: Travertine and concrete
- Condition: Partially preserved
- Public access: Yes

The tomb of Marcus Vergilius Eurysaces the baker is one of the largest and best-preserved freedman funerary monuments in Rome. Its sculpted frieze is a classic example of the "plebeian style" in Roman sculpture. Eurysaces built the tomb for himself and perhaps also his wife Atistia around the end of the Republic (ca. 50–20 BCE). Located in a prominent position just outside today's Porta Maggiore, the tomb was transformed by its incorporation into the Aurelian Wall; a tower subsequently erected by Honorius covered the tomb, the remains of which were exposed upon its removal by Gregory XVI in 1838. What is particularly significant about this extravagant tomb is that it was built by a freedman, a former slave.

Three sides of the slightly trapezoidal structure remain largely intact. All have the same form, with a plain lower storey now mostly below ground level but exposed, consisting of pairs of engaged columns between flat vertical slabs, all crammed together with no space in between. The effect is far from the classical orders; at the corners the slabs turn to pilasters rising at the top level to unorthodox capitals combining scrolls at the sides with plant forms in the centre. There are unusual circular openings in the topmost storey, now thought to represent kneading-basins or grain-measuring vessels. Below a cornice is the frieze, with continuous scenes in relief showing the operation of the bakery where Eurysaces made what was evidently a considerable fortune. Reconstructions imagine a gently rising roof above this, now lost.

== Marcus Vergilius Eurysaces ==
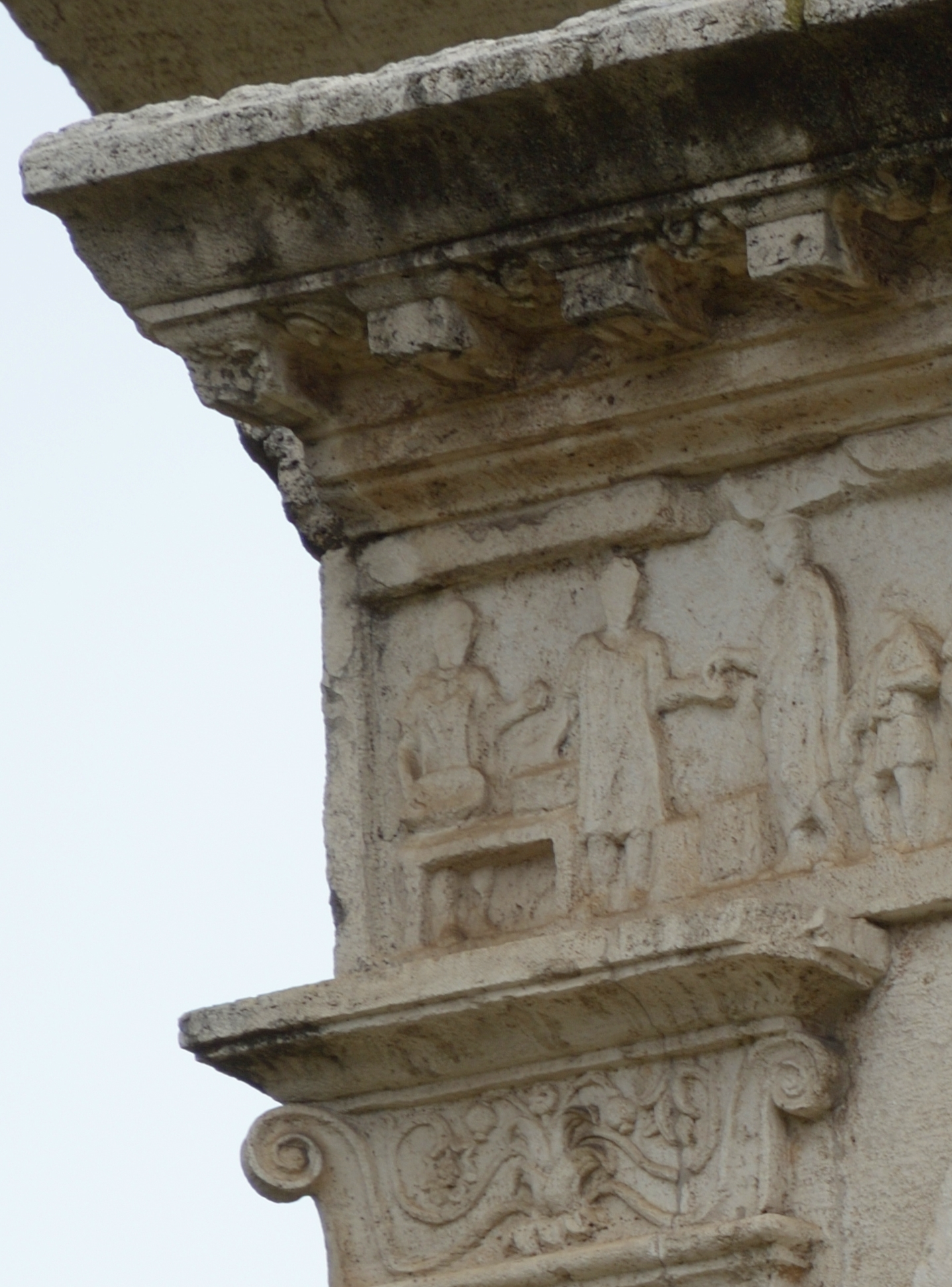
Detail of corner

Although there is no conclusive statement on the monument that Eurysaces was a freedman – there is no "L" for libertus in the inscription – there are a number of reasons for believing that this was the case. His name takes the form of a Roman praenomen and nomen followed by a Greek cognomen, nomenclature typical for a freedman, combining as it does the identity of the former owning family with that of the individual when a slave. The inscription also lacks the filiation usual for the freeborn. The banausic and labour-intensive activities commemorated, those of baking, are not usually celebrated by the freeborn upper classes. The unusual form of the monument and of its inscription have also been used to locate Eurysaces as a nouveau riche parvenu in the manner of Trimalchio, with his "naïve ostentation" vulgarly imitative of élite culture.

The slightly later Pyramid of Cestius is another individualistic tomb for an evidently wealthy man outside the traditional élite; in this case it perhaps referred to his taking part in campaigns in Nubia.

== Setting ==
Burial within the pomerium or sacred boundary of the city was generally prohibited. Although the precise extent of the pomerium at the various stages of its history is uncertain, it is believed to have later been coterminous with the Aurelian Walls, perhaps extending to the area of the Porta Maggiore after its expansion by Claudius. Streets of tombs in a prominent position just outside the city gates are known from Pompeii as well as the Via Appia. Eurysaces' tomb, at the junction of the Via Praenestina and Via Labicana just before entering Rome, was in a particularly prominent position, and its trapezoidal form was likely dictated by the space available. Other burial complexes in the vicinity are known, including the columbarium of Statilius Taurus, consul at the time of Augustus, with over seven hundred loculi or burial niches; and the first century BC tomb of the Societas Cantorum Graecorum (Association of Greek Singers). An inscription relating to another baker, Ogulnius, has also been found in local excavations. (Note: OGULNIUS PISTOR SIMI(laginarius) / AMICUS [Eurysacis?] or "Ogulnius, baker, flour-dealer, friend [of Eurysaces?]")

== Monument ==
The tomb, dwarfed by the later Aqua Claudia, rises to a height of about 7 meters. Of concrete faced with travertine on a tufa base, it stands as a monument both to Eurysaces and, through the frieze, to the wider profession of baking. The style, very different from the classical Roman styles of tombs, makes Eurysaces' tomb stand out.

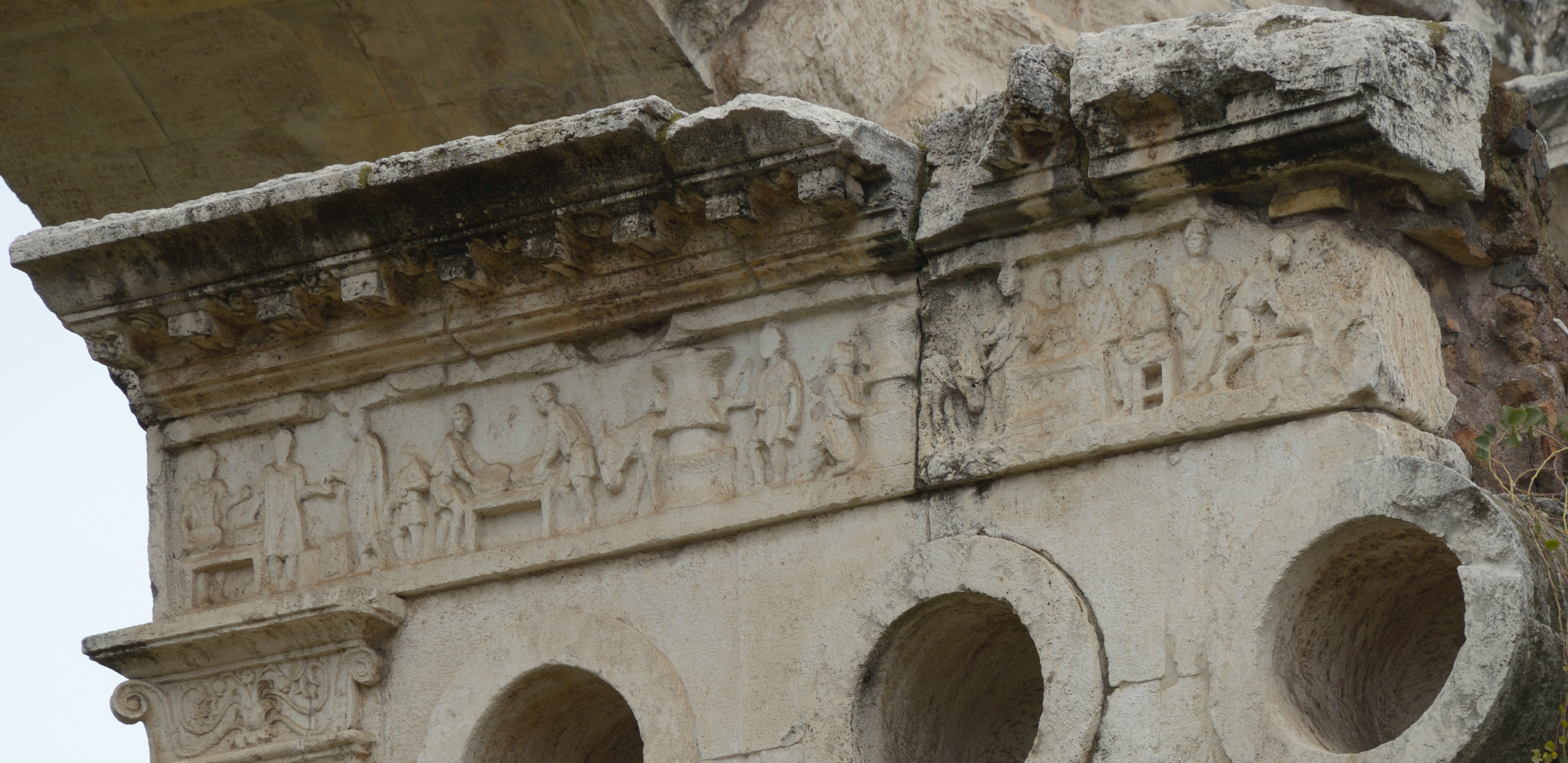
The bakery at work in frieze reliefs

The surviving part of the inscription reads EST HOC MONIMENTVM MARCEI VERGILEI EVRYSACIS PISTORIS REDEMPTORIS APPARET, or in English, "This is the monument of Marcus Vergilius Eurysaces, baker, contractor, public servant." While the final word in this quote, "Apparet", is often translated as public servant, the actual Latin word for a public servant is appāritor; the term can also apply to a gatekeeper, perhaps punning on the tomb's location. Appāret is a verb meaning "appears, makes apparent", this translation however does not seem to fit the rest of the inscription. The word Apparet is yet to be translated within the context of this quotation.

In the BBC documentary Meet the Romans with Mary Beard, professor Mary Beard translates appāret as "it's obvious!" Beard suggests appāret is signalling a joke, as if to say "get it?!". Thus Beard translates the epitaph as "This is the monument of Marcus Vergilius Eurysaces, baker, contractor, it's obvious."

A relief representing various stages of bread production runs along the top of the tomb. The relief depicts, on the south side, the delivery and grinding of grain and sifting of flour; on the north, the mixing and kneading of dough, forming of round loaves, and baking in a domed "pizza-type" oven; and, on the west, the stacking of loaves in baskets and their being taken for weighing.

== Related finds ==
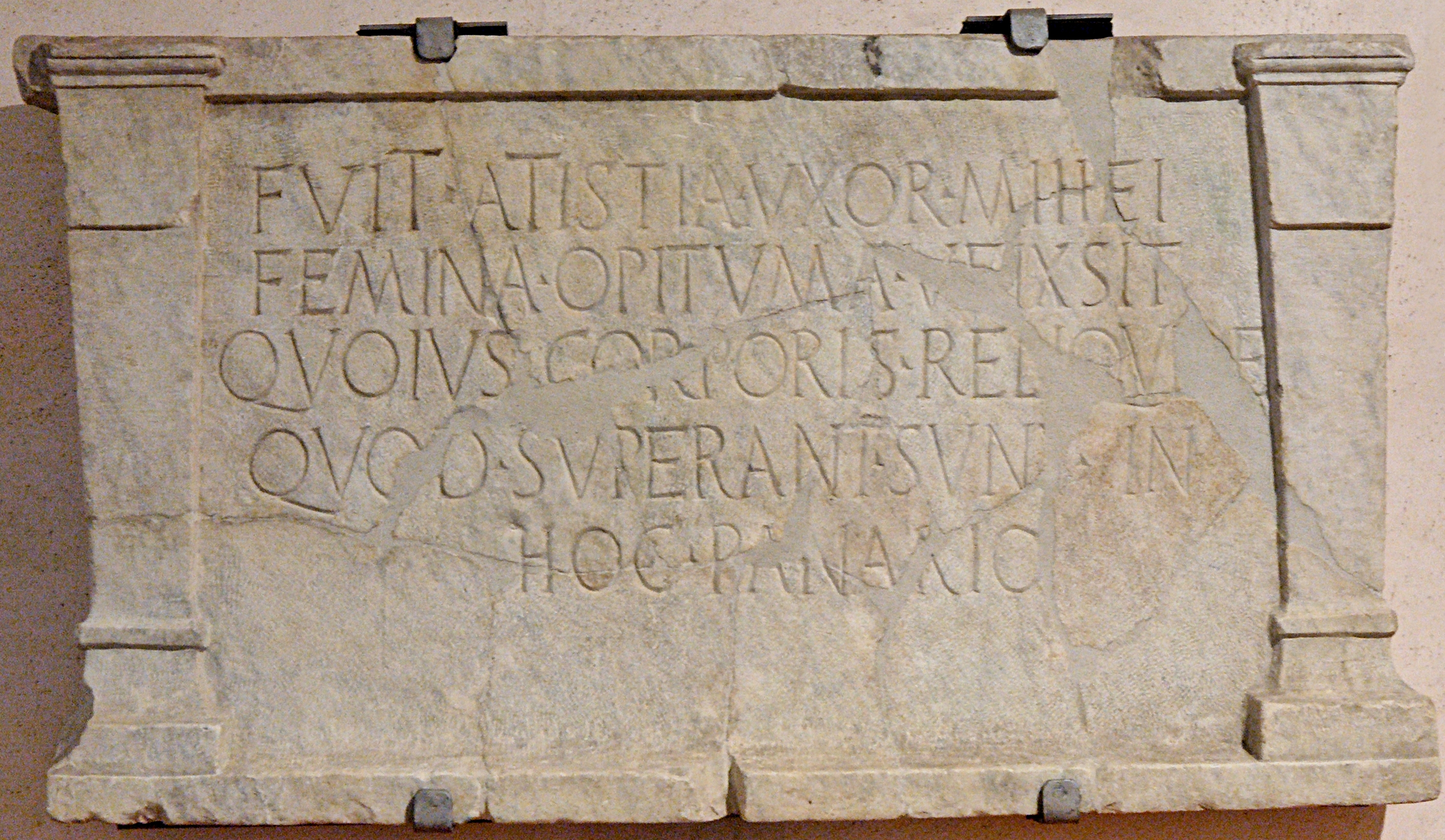
The Atistia inscription

During demolition of the superimposed late antique fortifications by Pope Gregory XVI in 1838, a full-length relief portrait was discovered of a man and woman in toga and palla (taken to the Palazzo dei Conservatori); along with an inscription honouring one Atistia, a good wife whose remains were placed in a breadbasket; and an urn taking the form of such a breadbasket. (Note: FVIT ATISTIA VXOR MIHEI / FEMINA OPITVMA VEIXSIT / QVOIVS CORPORIS RELIQVAE / QVOD SVPERANT SVNT IN / HOC PANARIO or "Atistia was my wife; a most excellent lady in life; the surviving remains of her body are in this breadbasket") Theft of the female head from the relief in 1934 and uncertainty as to the present whereabouts of the urn, believed to be somewhere in the Museo Nazionale Romano, mean their study is now conducted from excavation drawings and early photographs. Reconstructions generally relate these items to the tomb on the grounds of their style, subject matter, and findspot, with Atistia becoming Eurysaces' wife, and the double relief and inscription occupying the upper register of the now lost east facade of the tomb.

== Freedmen's Tombs ==
This tomb may be one of many lavish tombs created by freedmen. These men were originally slaves, who then gained their freedom and became Roman citizens. Freedom could be granted by their masters for their hard work, or be bought through their peculia, or earnings. Upon becoming free, they were still subjected to some service to their former masters. However, they were proud of their work as it was the means by which they gained their freedom. Because of this, they many times created lavish funerary monuments, such as Eurysaces' tomb. Outside their former owners, these freedmen had no official family lines, which were important in Roman society. Therefore, these tombs may have been attempts at beginning a family history for future generations to appreciate.

== See also ==
- List of ancient monuments in Rome

== Notes ==
Preceded by Pyramid of Cestius	Landmarks of Rome; Tomb of Eurysaces the Baker	Succeeded by Tomb of Hilarus Fuscus
