= Epulones =

Religious corporation of ancient Roman

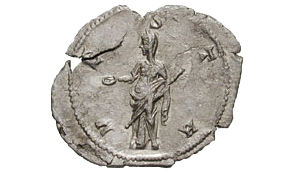
Goddess (Vesta or Concordia), extending a patera, emblem of the Epulones

The epulones (Latin for "feasters"; sing. epulo) was a religious organization of Ancient Rome. They arranged feasts and public banquets at festivals and games (ludi). They constituted one of the four great religious corporations (quattuor amplissima collegia) of ancient Roman priests.

== Establishment and influence ==
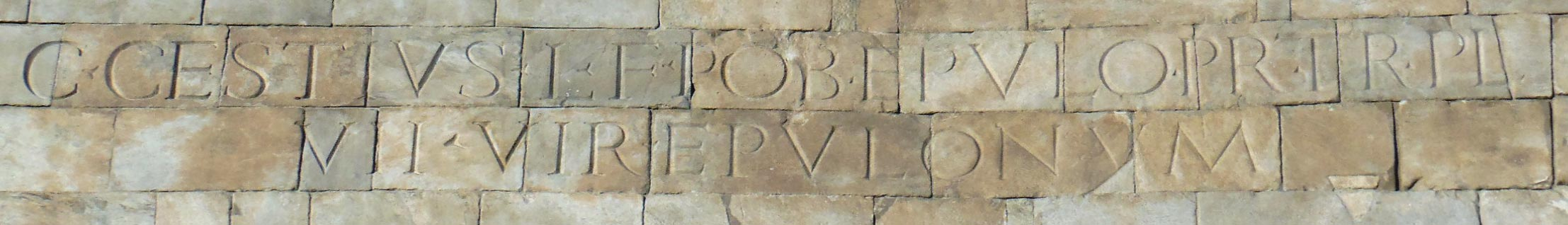
Inscription on the Pyramid of Cestius, noting that Gaius Cestius (1st century BC) was a member of the College of Epulones (EPVLO) and one of the septemviri Epulonum (VII·VIR·EPVLONVM).

The college was founded in 196 BC due to a law passed by Gaius Licinius Lucullus. The need for such a college arose as the increasingly elaborate festivals required experts to oversee their organization. They were tasked with attending and managing banquets known as epulum which were dedicated to the gods. One major epulum was the Epulum Jovis which was dedicated to Jupiter. Previously these banquets were managed by the pontiffs.

There were four great religious corporations (quattuor amplissima collegia) of ancient Roman priests; the two most important were the College of Pontiffs and the college of augurs; the fourth was the quindecimviri sacris faciundis. The third college was the epulones; their duties to arrange the feasts and public banquets for festivals and games (ludi) had originally been carried out by the pontiffs.

The College of Epulones was established long after civil reforms had opened the magistracies and most priesthoods to plebeians, who were thus eligible from its beginning. Initially there were three epulones, but later their number was increased to seven by Sulla; hence they were also known as the septemviri epulonum, "seven men of the sacrificial banquets". Julius Caesar expanded the college to ten, but after his death it was reduced back to seven. The college continued to exist into the fourth century, although it faded away due to the rise of Christianity.

The patera was the sacred bowl used by the epulones. It was shallow with a raised center so that when held in the palm, the thumb could be placed on the raised centre without profaning the libation, as it is poured into the focus, or sacred fire. The patera was the special emblem of the epulones. The paten used today by Roman Catholic priests and in some protestant traditions omits the raised center.
