= The Vision of the Cross =

1520-24 painting by Raphael

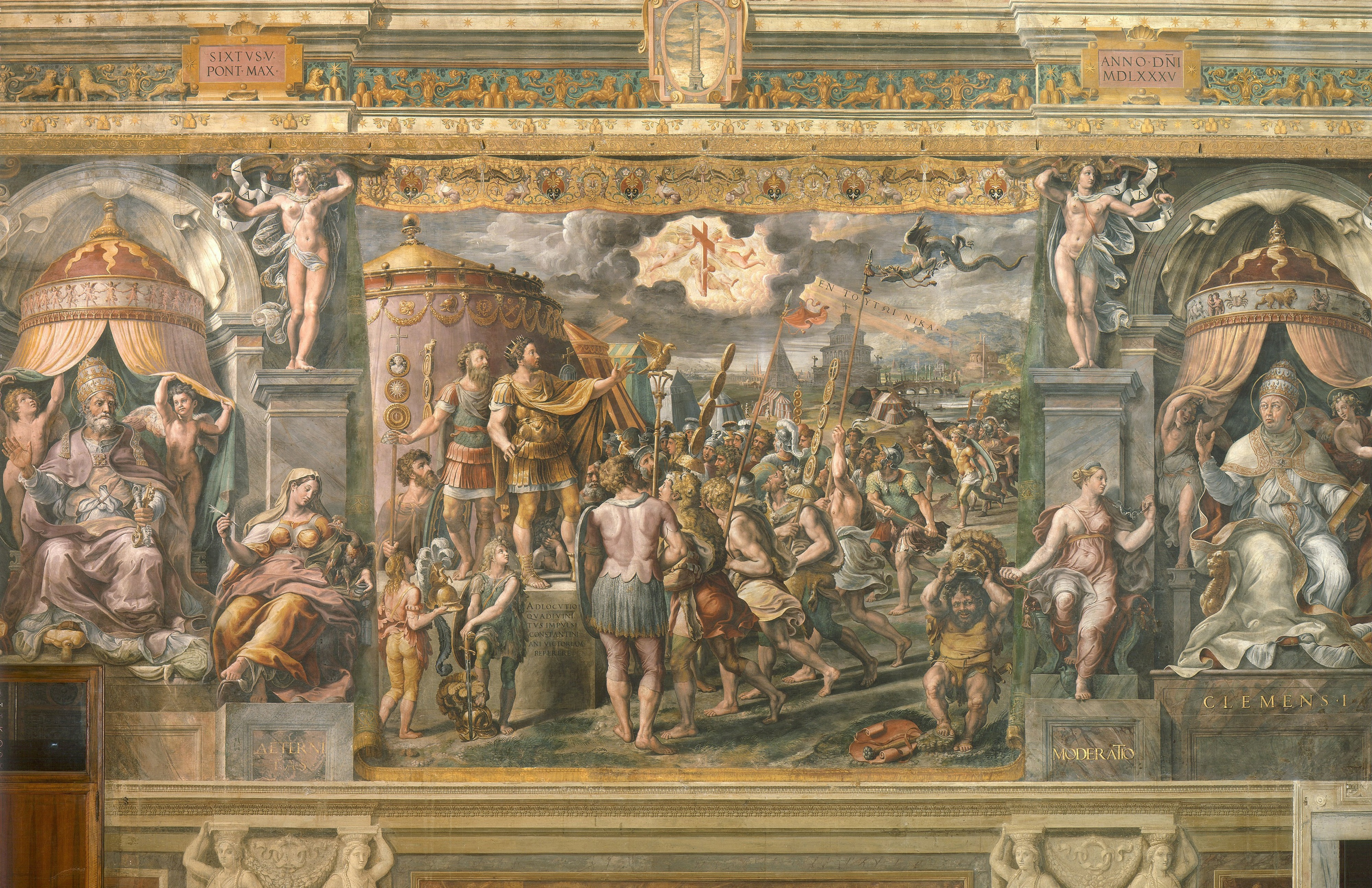
- Artist: Circle of Raphael
- Year: 1520–24
- Type: Fresco
- Location: Apostolic Palace, Vatican Museums; Vatican City

The Vision of the Cross is a painting made between 1520 and 1524 by assistants of the Italian renaissance artist Raphael. After the master's death in 1520, Gianfrancesco Penni, Giulio Romano and Raffaellino del Colle from Raphael's workshop worked together to finish the commission to decorate with frescoes the rooms that are now known as the Stanze di Raffaello, in the Apostolic Palace in the Vatican.

The Vision of the Cross is located in the Sala di Costantino ("Hall of Constantine"). In the painting, emperor Constantine I is seen just before the Battle of the Milvian Bridge on October 27, 312. According to legend, a cross appeared to Constantine in the sky, after which as seen in the fresco and following Eusebius of Caesarea Vita Constantini, he adopted the Greek motto "Εν τούτῳ νίκα", i.e. "By this, conquer", a motto that has been rendered in Latin as "In hoc signo vinces", i.e. "In this sign you shall conquer".

This Mannerist painting is a crowded and confused melee and melange of images, including a dragon, a dwarf, two popes, and various symbols. Proportions among the soldiers appear confused, with some dwarfed by more distant figures.

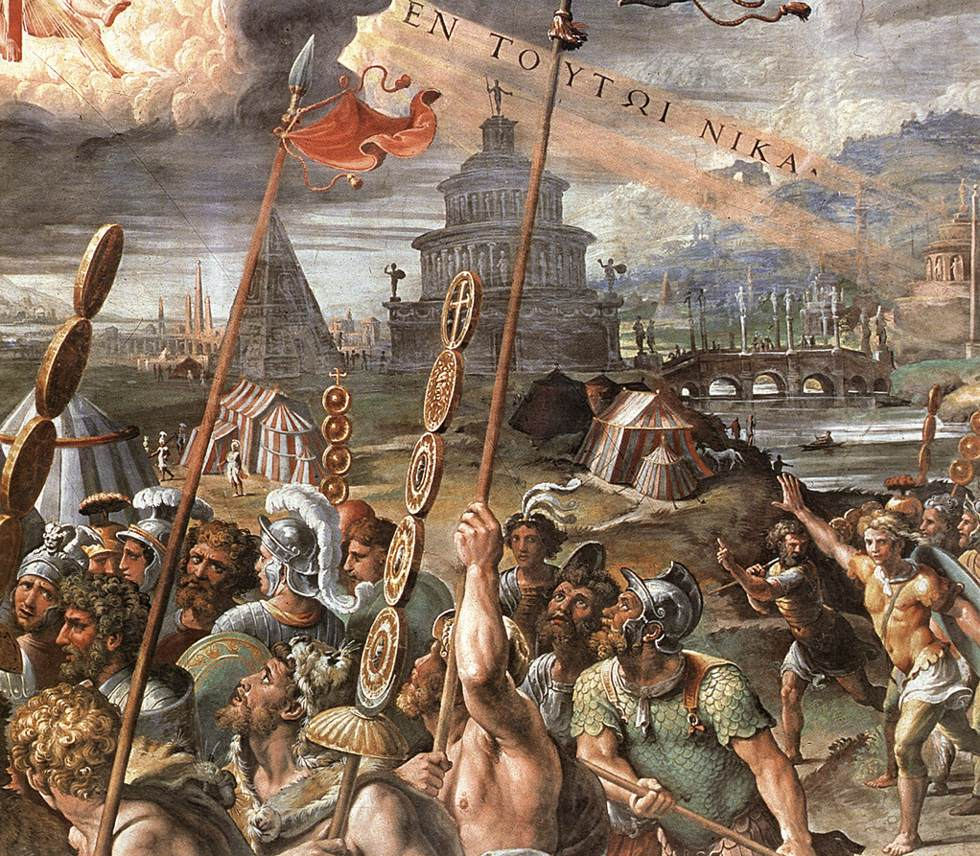
The Vision of the Cross (detail) with the Meta Romuli and the Mausoleum of Hadrian in the background

== See also ==
- Chi Rho, the symbol claimed in contemporary versions of the legend
