= Pyramid of Cestius =

Ancient Roman pyramid, a landmark of Rome, Italy

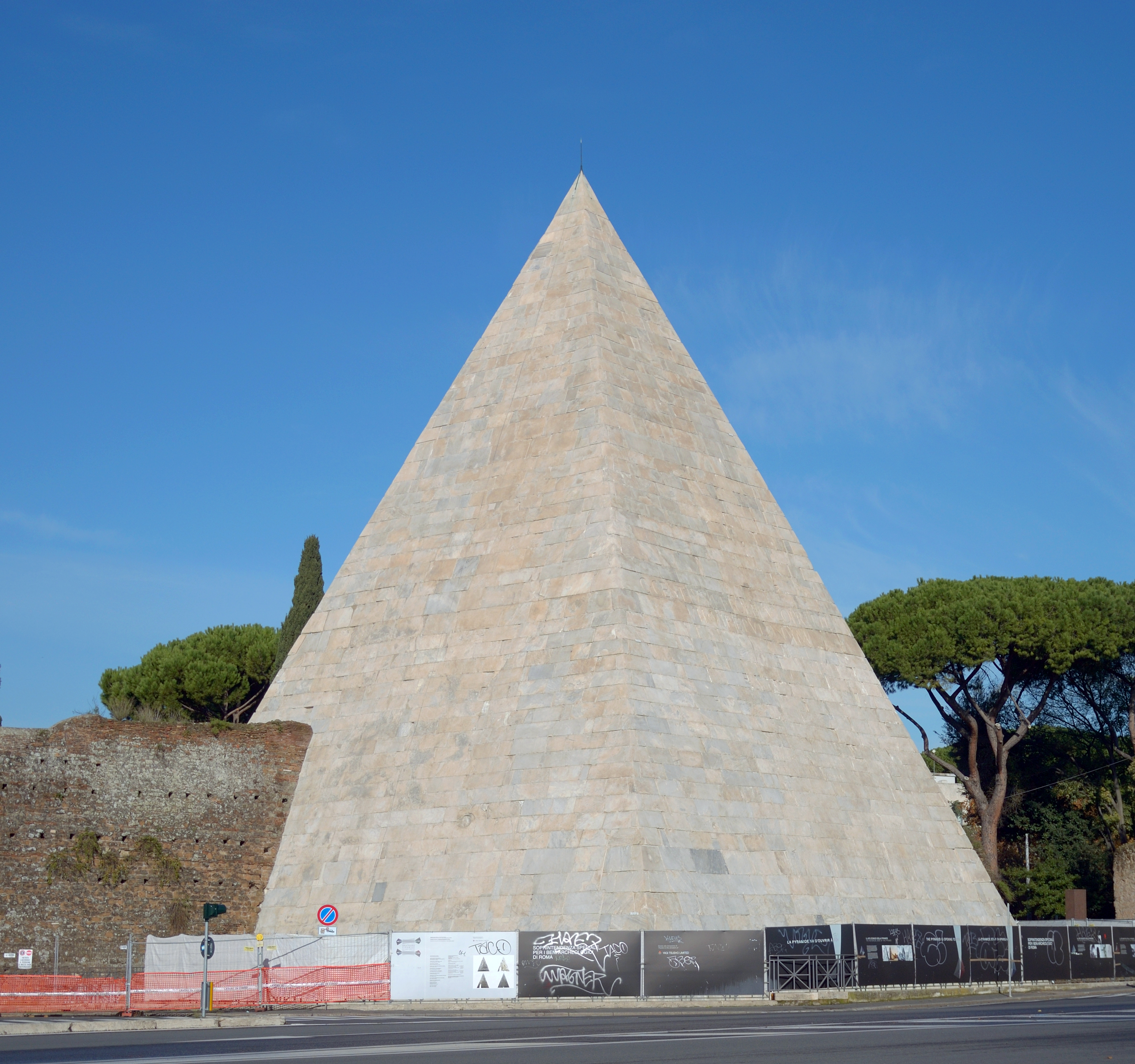
- The Pyramid of Cestius

- Location within Rome
- Interactive map of Pyramid of Cestius
- 41°52′35″N 12°28′51″E
- Type: Pyramid
- Location: Regio XIII Aventinus

History
- Built: c. 12 BC
- Built by: Gaius Cestius

The pyramid of Cestius (in Italian, Piramide di Caio Cestio or Piramide Cestia) is an ancient Roman pyramid in Rome, Italy, near the Porta San Paolo and the Protestant Cemetery. It was built in the style of the Nubian pyramids as a tomb for Gaius Cestius, a member of the Epulones religious corporation. It stands at a fork between two ancient roads, the Via Ostiensis and another road that ran west to the Tiber along the approximate line of the modern Via Marmorata. Due to its incorporation into the city's fortifications, it is today one of the best-preserved ancient buildings in Rome.

== Physical attributes ==
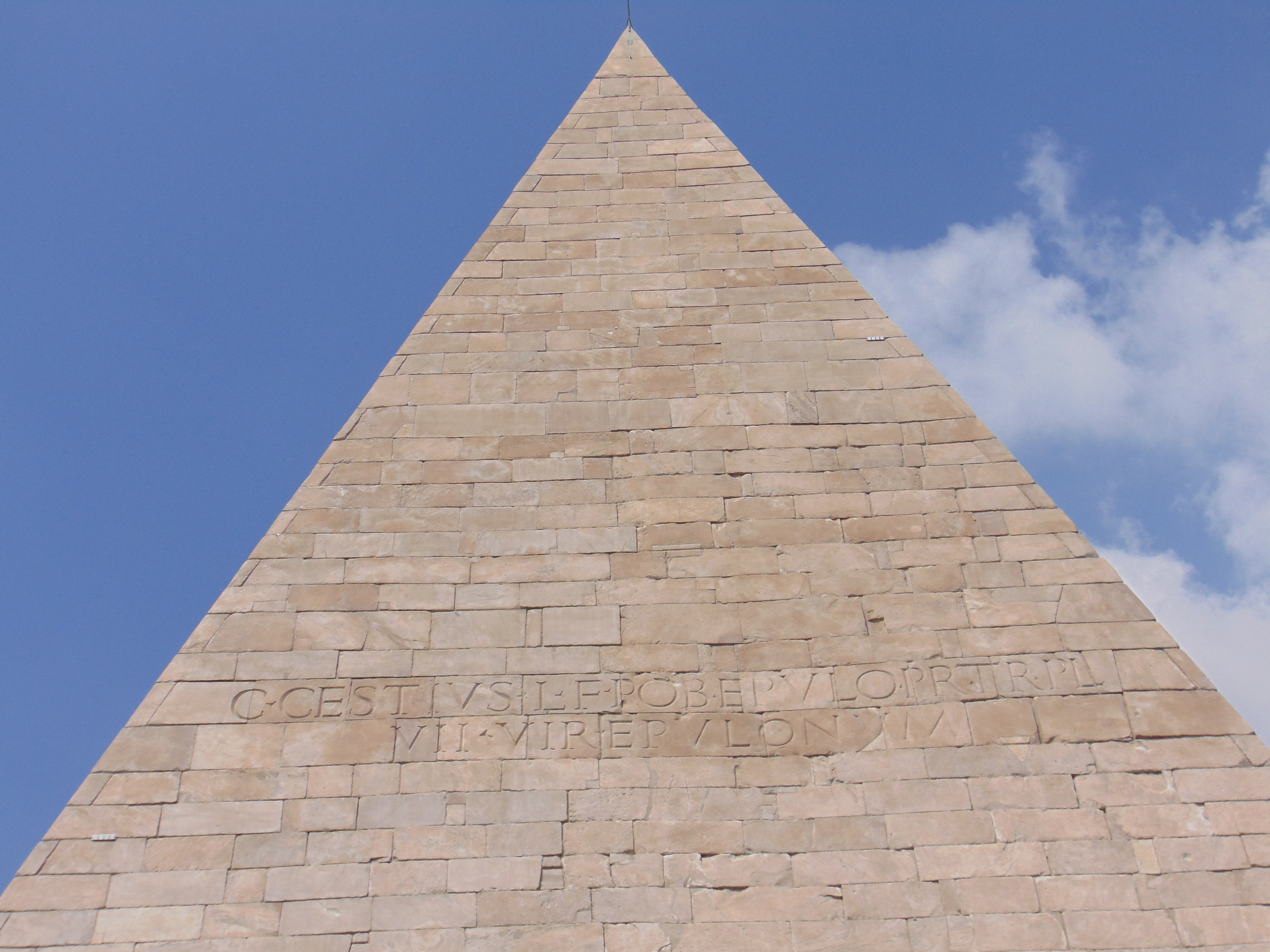
Detail of the pyramid

The pyramid was built about 18–12 BC as a tomb for Gaius Cestius, a magistrate and member of one of the four great religious corporations in Rome, the Septemviri Epulonum. It is of brick-faced concrete covered with slabs of white marble standing on a travertine foundation. The pyramid measures 100 Roman feet (29.6 m) square at the base and stands 125 Roman feet (37 m) high.

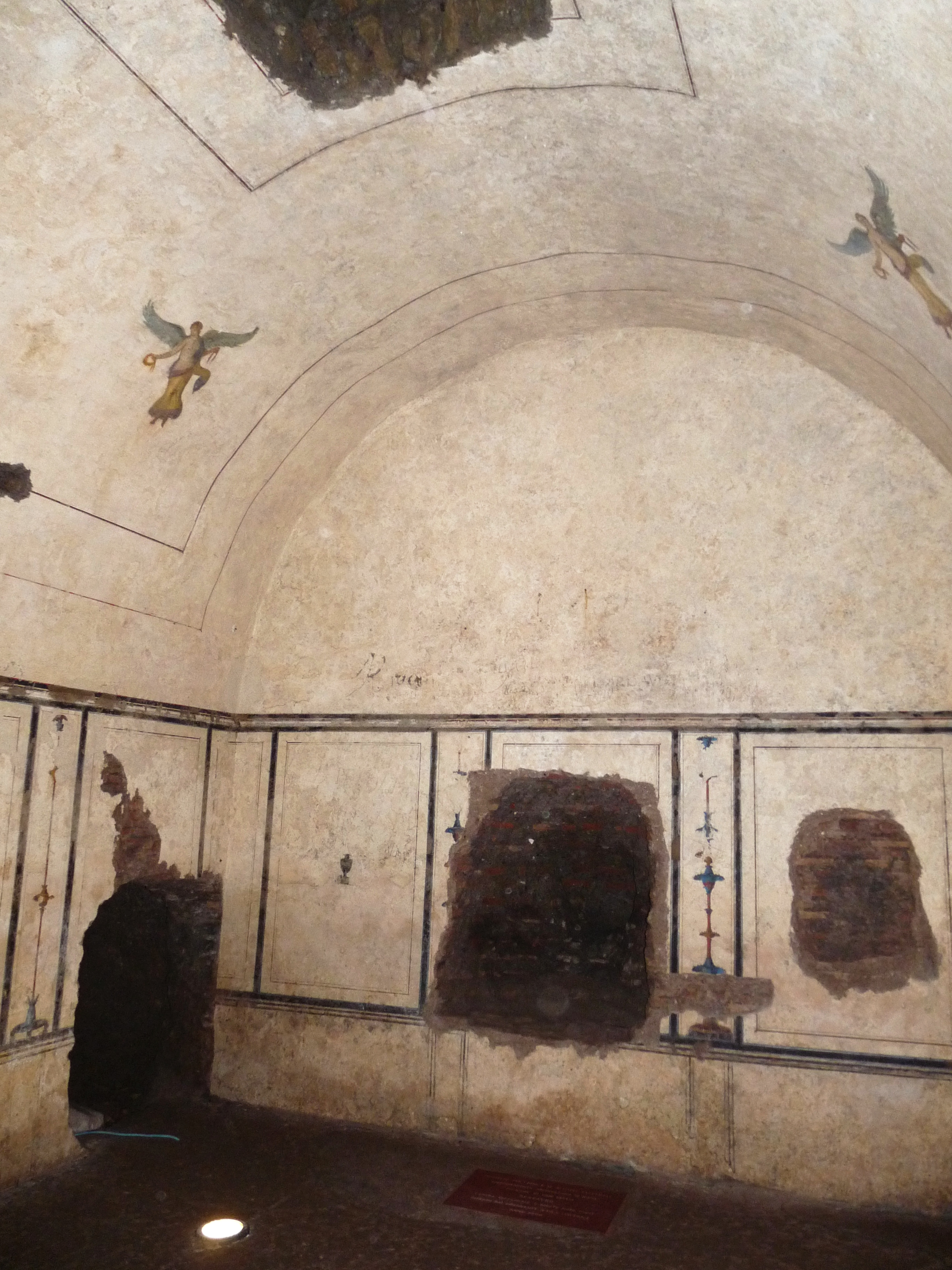
Pyramid Caius Cestius room inside

In the interior is the burial chamber, a simple barrel-vaulted rectangular cavity measuring 5.95 metres long, 4.10 m wide and 4.80 m high. When opened in 1660, the chamber was found to be decorated with frescoes, which were recorded by Pietro Santo Bartoli. Only scant traces of these frescoes survive, and no trace of any other contents. The tomb had been sealed when it was built, with no exterior entrance, but had been plundered at some time thereafter, probably during antiquity. Until the end of restoration works in 2015, it was not possible for visitors to access the interior, except by special permission typically only granted to scholars. Since the beginning of May 2015, the pyramid is open to the public every second and fourth Saturday each month. Visitors must arrange their visit in advance.

== Inscriptions ==
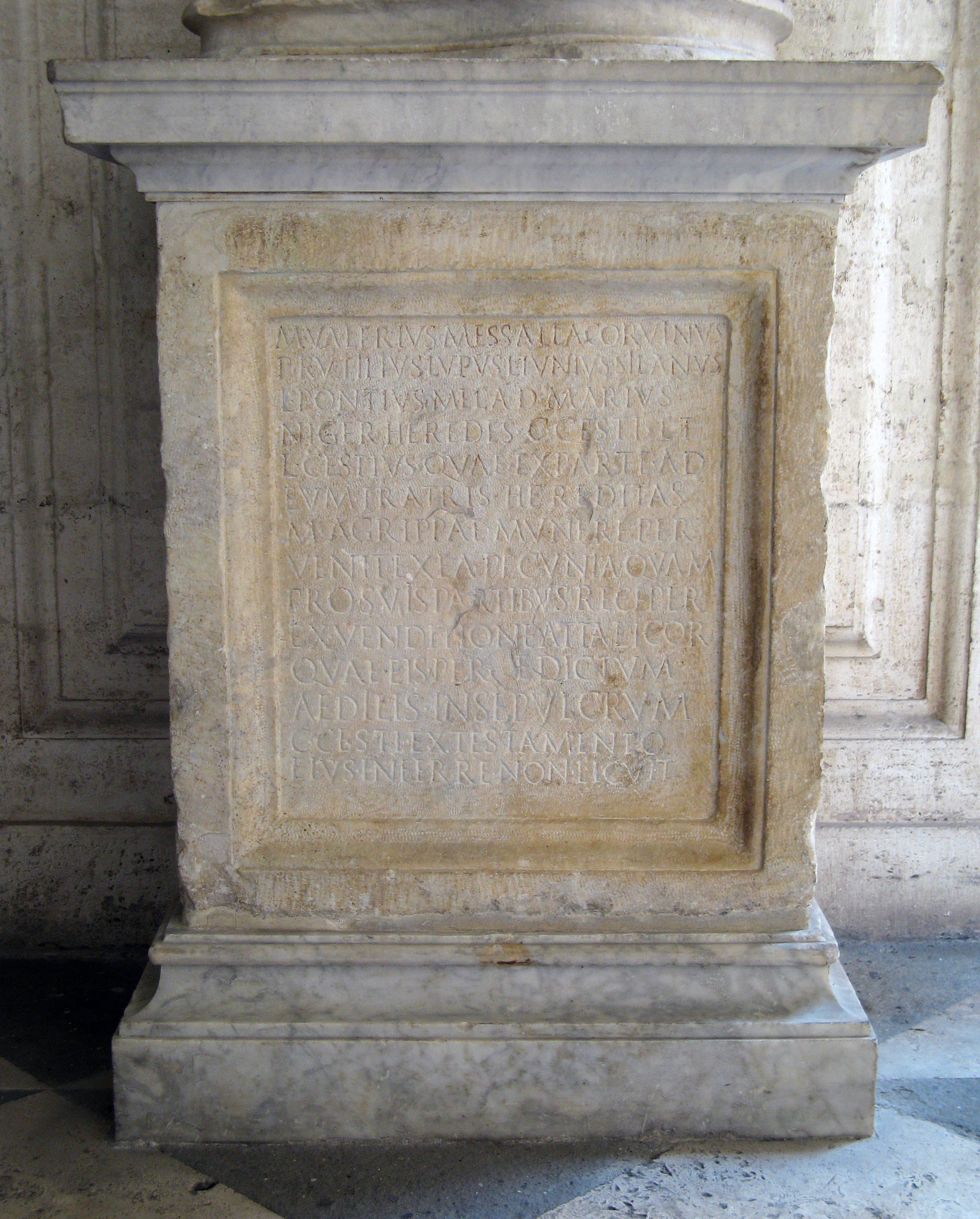
One of two inscribed bases found outside the tomb in 1660 (CIL VI 1375)

A dedicatory inscription is carved on both northwestern and southeastern faces, so as to be visible from both sides. It reads:

G⸱CESTIVS⸱L⸱F⸱POB⸱EPVLO⸱PR⸱TR⸱PL
VII⸱VIR⸱EPVLONVM

Gaius Cestius, son of Lucius, of the Pobilia [voting tribe], member of the College of Epulones, praetor, tribune of the plebs, septemvir of the Epulones

Below the inscription only on the southeastern face is a second inscription recording the circumstances of the tomb's construction. This reads:

OPVS⸱APSOLVTVM⸱EX⸱TESTAMENTO⸱DIEBVS⸱CCCXXX
ARBITRATV
PONTI⸱P⸱F⸱CLA⸱MELAE⸱HEREDIS⸱ET⸱POTHI⸱L

The work was completed, in accordance with the will, in 330 days, by the decision of the heir [Lucius] Pontus Mela, son of Publius of the Claudia, and Pothus, freedman

Another inscription on the east face is of modern origins, having been carved on the orders of Pope Alexander VII in 1663. Reading "INSTAVRATVM⸱AN⸱DOMINI⸱MDCLXIII", it commemorates excavation and restoration work carried out in and around the tomb between 1660–62.

At the time of its construction, the pyramid of Cestius would have stood in open countryside (tombs being forbidden within the city walls). Rome grew enormously during the imperial period, and, by the 3rd century AD, the pyramid would have been surrounded by buildings. It originally stood in a low-walled enclosure, flanked by statues, columns and other tombs. Two marble bases were found next to the pyramid during excavations in the 1660s, with fragments of the bronze statues that originally had stood upon them. The bases, now in the Capitoline Museums, carry identical inscriptions:

M⸱VALERIVS⸱MESSALLA⸱CORVINVS
P⸱RVTILIVS⸱LVPVS⸱L⸱IVNIVS⸱SILANVS
L⸱PONTIVS⸱MELA⸱D⸱MARIVS
NIGER⸱HEREDES⸱C⸱CESTI⸱ET
L⸱CESTIVS⸱QVAE⸱EX⸱PARTE⸱AD
EVM⸱FRATRIS⸱HEREDITAS
M⸱AGRIPPAE⸱MVNERE⸱PER
VENIT⸱EX⸱EA⸱PECVNIA⸱QVAM
PRO⸱SVIS⸱PARTIBVS⸱RECEPER
EX⸱VENDITIONE⸱ATTALICOR
QVAE⸱EIS⸱PER⸱EDICTVM
AEDILIS⸱IN⸱SEPVLCRVM
C⸱CESTI⸱EX⸱TESTAMENTO
EIVS⸱INFERRE⸱NON⸱LICVIT

This identifies Cestius' heirs as Marcus Valerius Messala Corvinus, a famous general; Publius Rutilius Lupus, an orator whose father of the same name had been consul in 90 BC; and Lucius Junius Silanus, a member of the distinguished gens Junia. The heirs had set up the statues and bases using money raised from the sale of valuable cloths (attalici). Cestius had stated in his will that the cloths were to be deposited in the tomb, but this practice had been forbidden by a recent edict passed by the aediles.

== History ==
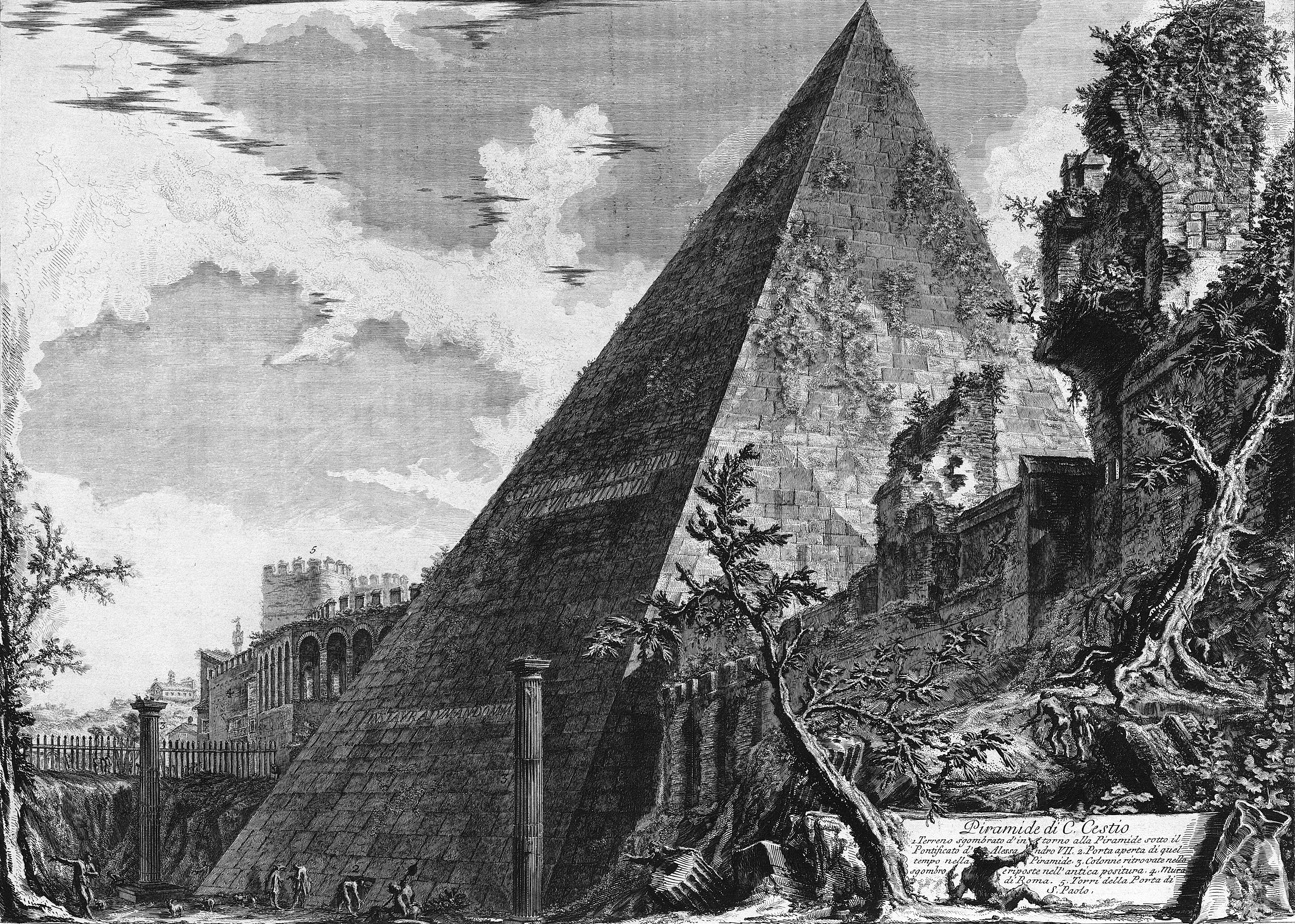
Pyramid of Cestius by Giovanni Battista Piranesi (18th century)

The pyramid was built for Gaius Cestius Epulo, the son of Lucius, of the tribe of Pobilia. The inscription on it mentions that Cestius was a praetor, a tribune of the plebs, and a septemvir of the Epulones. The tomb was completed in 330 days and was one of two pyramid-shaped tombs in the city of Rome. Its construction was regulated by sumptuary laws, which limit extreme displays of wealth such as in feasts, clothing, funerals, and tombs. While these laws can be traced back to the mid-5th century BC, they were much more strictly passed and enforced around the time of Cestius’ death.

The sharply pointed shape of the pyramid is strongly reminiscent of the pyramids of Nubia, in particular of the kingdom of Meroë, which had been attacked by Rome in 23 BC. The similarity suggests that Cestius had possibly served in that campaign and perhaps intended the pyramid to serve as a commemoration. His pyramid was not the only one in Rome; a larger one—the "pyramid of Romulus" — of similar form but unknown origins stood between the Vatican and the Mausoleum of Hadrian but was dismantled in the 16th century by Pope Alexander VI and the marble was used for the steps of St. Peter's Basilica.

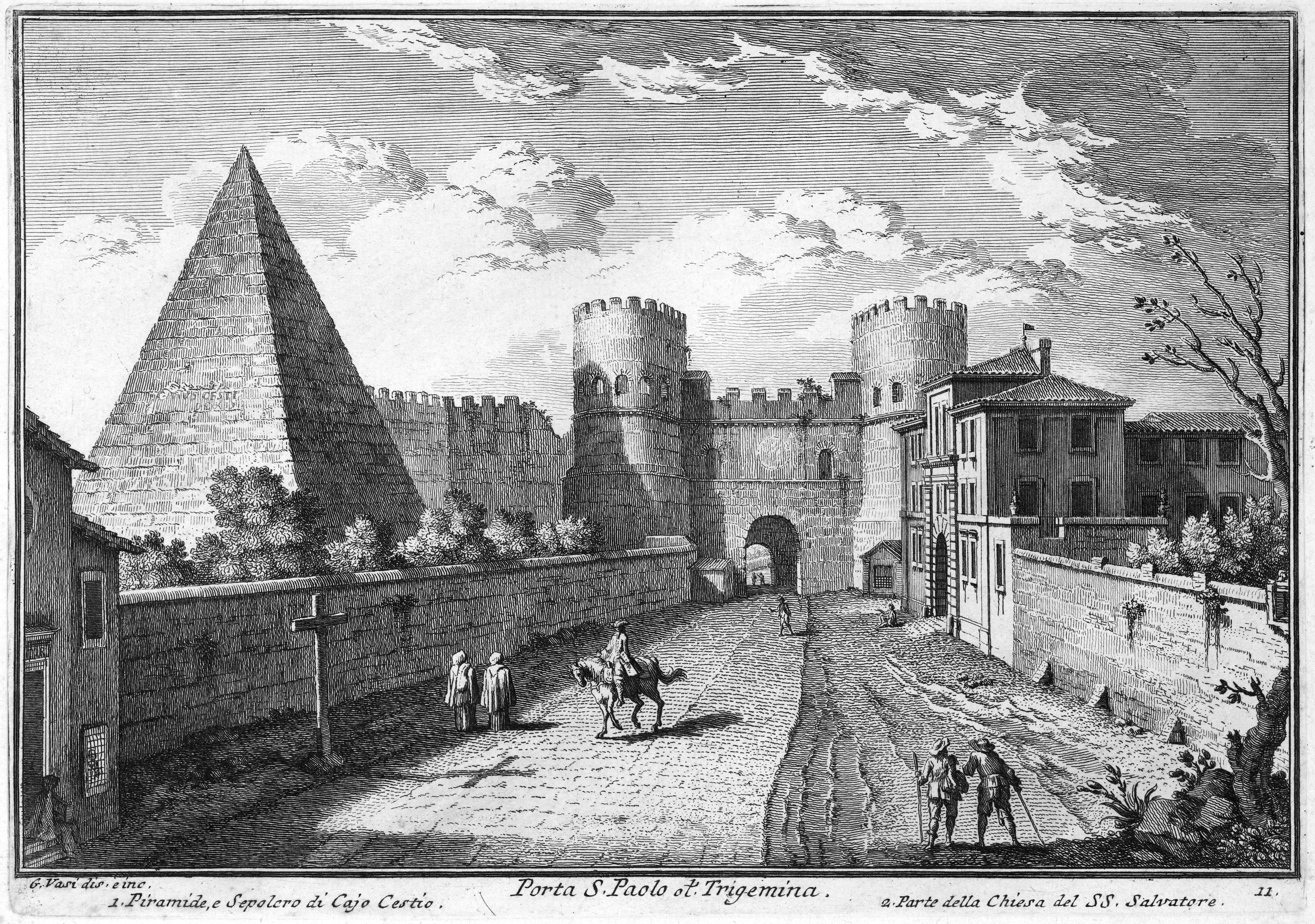
Pyramid of Cestius and environs by Giuseppe Vasi (18th century)

Some writers have questioned whether the Roman pyramids were modelled on the much less steeply pointed Egyptian pyramids exemplified by the famous pyramids of Giza. However, the relatively shallow Giza-type pyramids were not exclusively used by the Egyptians; steeper pyramids of the Nubian type were favored by the Ptolemaic dynasty of Egypt that had been brought to an end in the Roman conquest of 30 BC. The pyramid was, in any case, built during a period when Rome was going through a fad for all things Egyptian. The fusion of Roman and Egyptian styles is further highlighted by the fact that the exterior is distinctly "egyptianizing", while the interior displays classic Roman fresco paintings and a barrel vaulted ceiling. The Circus Maximus was adorned by Augustus with an Egyptian obelisk, and pyramids were built elsewhere in the Roman Empire around this time.

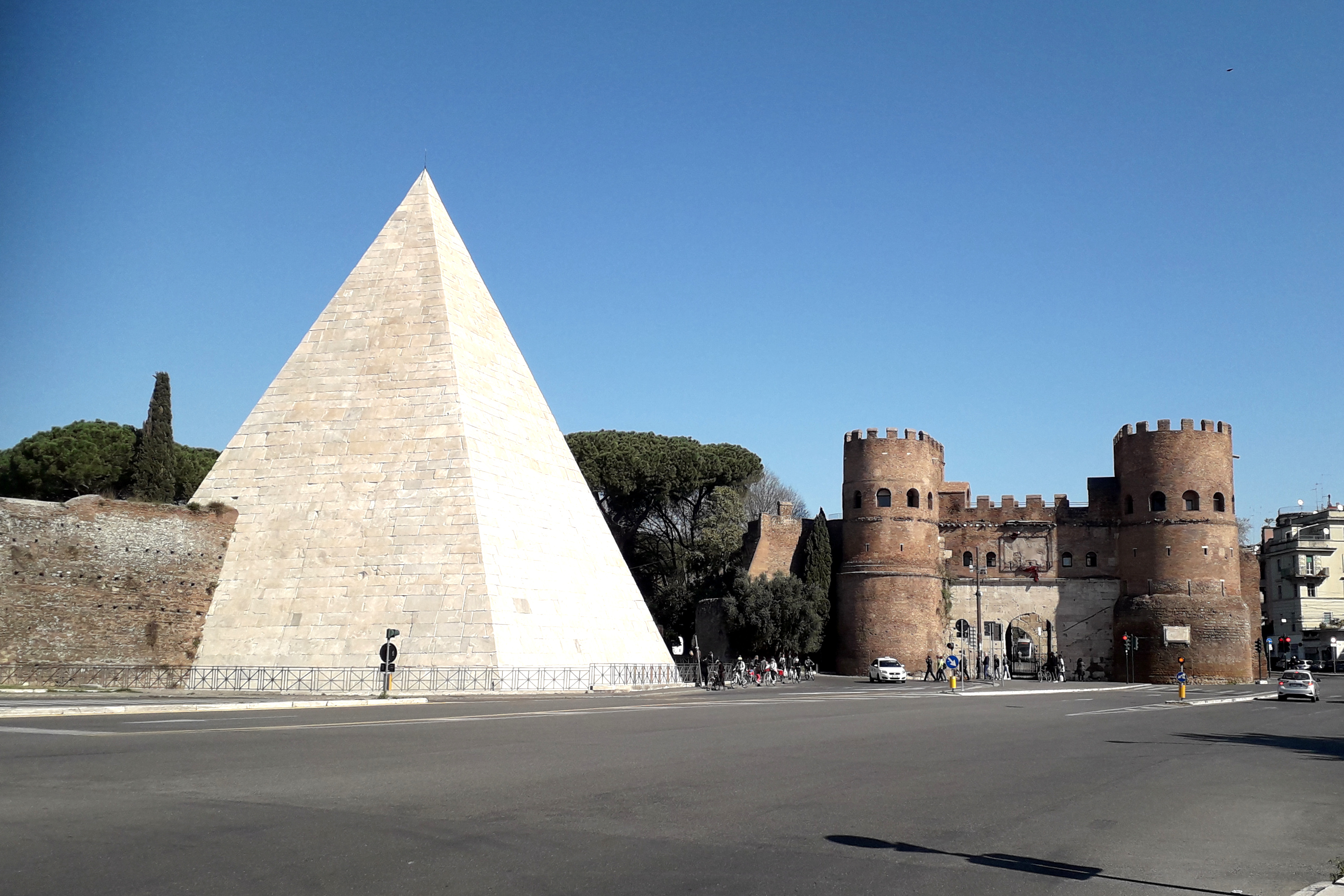
The pyramid was incorporated into the Aurelian Walls and is close to Porta San Paolo (on the right).

During the construction of the Aurelian Walls between 271 and 275, the pyramid was incorporated into the walls to form a triangular bastion. It was one of many structures in the city to be reused to form part of the new walls, probably to reduce the cost and enable the structure to be built more quickly. It still forms part of a well-preserved stretch of the walls, a short distance from the Porta San Paolo.

The origins of the pyramid were forgotten during the Middle Ages. The inhabitants of Rome came to believe that it was the tomb of Remus (Meta Remi) and that its counterpart near the Vatican was the tomb of Romulus, a belief recorded by Petrarch. Its true provenance was clarified by Pope Alexander VII's excavations in the 1660s, which cleared the vegetation that had overgrown the pyramid, uncovered the inscriptions on its faces, tunnelled into the tomb's burial chamber and found the bases of two bronze statues that had stood alongside the pyramid.

Comparison of approximate profiles of notable pyramidal or near-pyramidal buildings. Dotted lines indicate original heights, where data is available. In its SVG file, hover over a pyramid to highlight and click for its article.

The pyramid was an essential sight for many who undertook the Grand Tour in the 18th and 19th centuries. It was much admired by architects, becoming the primary model for pyramids built in the West during this period. Percy Bysshe Shelley described it as "one keen pyramid with wedge sublime" in Adonaïs, his 1821 elegy for John Keats. In turn the English novelist and poet Thomas Hardy saw the pyramid during a visit to the nearby Protestant Cemetery in 1887 and was inspired to write a poem, Rome: At the Pyramid of Cestius near the Graves of Shelley and Keats, in which he wondered: "Who, then was Cestius, / and what is he to me?"

In 2001, the pyramid's entrance and interior underwent restoration. In 2011, further work was announced to clean and restore the pyramid's badly damaged marble cladding, through which water seepage has endangered the frescoes within. The restoration is sponsored by Japanese businessman Yuzo Yagi, whose €1-million donation resulted in a call for tenders to carry out the work issued by the Soprintendenza Speciale per i Beni Archeologici di Roma whose officials drew up the project and are supervising such an intervention along with Italy's Ministry of Cultural Heritage. Restoration work started in March 2013.

The pyramid is the namesake of the Piramide station of the Rome Metro.

== See also ==
- Meta Romuli
- List of ancient monuments in Rome

Preceded by Mausoleum of Maxentius	Landmarks of Rome; Pyramid of Cestius	Succeeded by Tomb of Eurysaces the Baker
