= Portrait of Francesco delle Opere =

1494 painting by Perugino

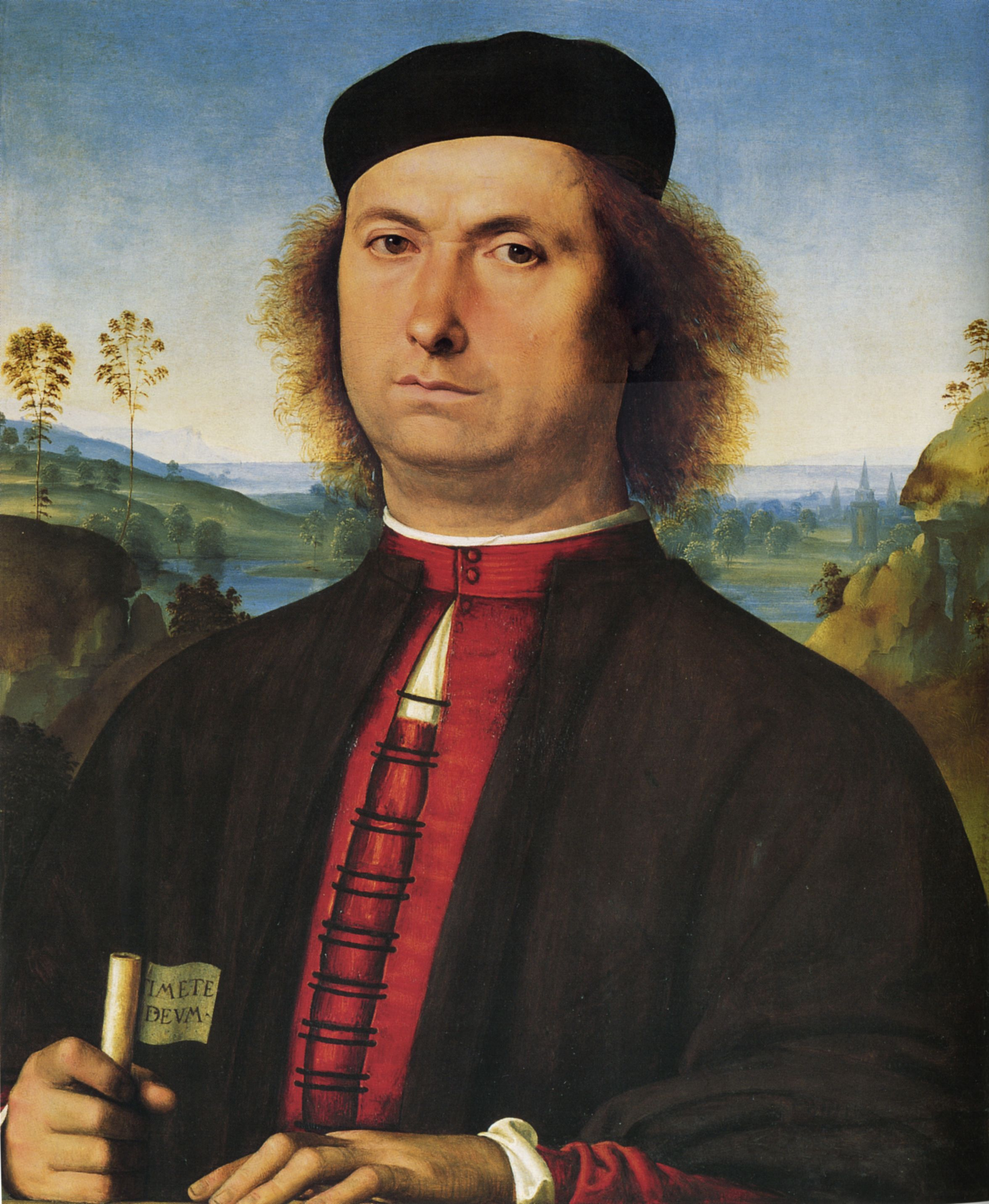
- Artist: Pietro Perugino
- Year: 1494
- Medium: Oil on panel
- Dimensions: 52 cm × 44 cm (20 in × 17 in)
- Location: Uffizi Gallery, Florence

The Portrait of Francesco delle Opere is a painting by the Italian Renaissance artist Perugino, dating to 1494 and housed in the Uffizi Gallery, Florence.

== History ==
The first mention of the painting is in the inventory of Cardinal Leopoldo de' Medici's artworks, as a work of "Second Manner Raphael". In the 19th century it was attributed to Perugino and Jacopo Francia, and then again to Perugino by Antonio Ramirez de Montalvo, who discovered an inscription in the rear. This reads: "1494 DI LVGLIO PIETRO PERVGINO PINSE FRANC[ESC]O DEL LOPRE PEYNAGA".

It was long considered a self-portrait, and from 1883 it was therefore exhibited in the gallery of self-portraits in the Vasarian Corridor. In 1881 the subject was finally identified as Francesco delle Opere (died 1516), a gem carver and a friend of Perugino.

== Description ==
Francesco delle Opere is portrayed from three-quarters, with a black beret and a mantle of the same color, a red blouse under which is a white shirt. His hand holds a cartouche with the words Timete Devm ("Beware of God"), the beginning of a famous preaching by Girolamo Savonarola. The hands lie on an invisible parapet which coincides with the painting's lower border, as in Flemish contemporary works such as Hans Memling's Man with a Letter.

Aside from the attention to details (typical of contemporary Flemish art), the painting share with Memling's also the presence of a city with pointed towers on the left. The presence of small trees and a lake in the background landscape are typical of the Umbrian school of the period.

== See also ==
- Portrait of Lorenzo di Credi
- Portrait of Perugino

== Sources ==
- Garibaldi, Vittoria (2004). "Perugino". Pittori del Rinascimento. Florence: Scala.
