= Saint Sebastian (Perugino, Stockholm) =

Painting by Pietro Perugino

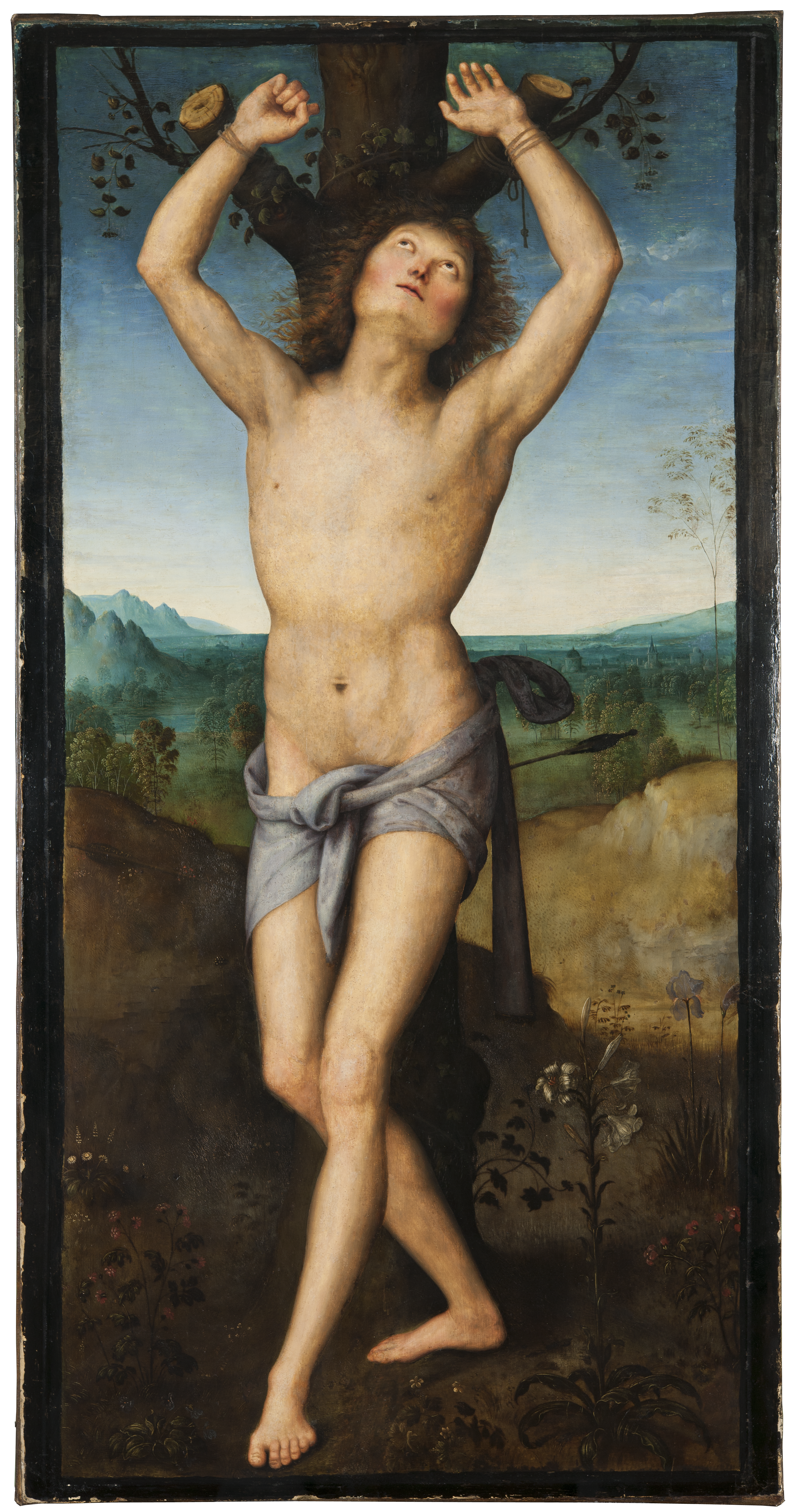
- Artist: Pietro Perugino
- Year: c. 1490
- Medium: Oil on panel
- Dimensions: 174 cm × 88 cm (69 in × 35 in)
- Location: Nationalmuseum, Stockholm

Saint Sebastian is an oil painting on panel by Pietro Perugino, completed c. 1490. The painting has been in the Nationalmuseum in Stockholm since 1928. It is one of the artist's earliest depictions of Saint Sebastian, showing him as an ephebos, or male adolescent, unlike his later treatments based on the Doryphoros, such as that in the Louvre. It is signed "Petrus Perusinus pinxit" ('Pietro Perugino painted [it]').

== History ==
The painting signed "Petrus Perusinus pinxit" is one of the earliest examples of Saint Sebastian painted by Perugino, appearing for the first time in the fresco Saint Sebastian between Saints Roch and Peter in Cerqueto, near Perugia. The work has been in the Swedish Museum since 1928.
