= Saint Sebastian Between Saints Roch and Peter =

Fresco by Pietro Perugino

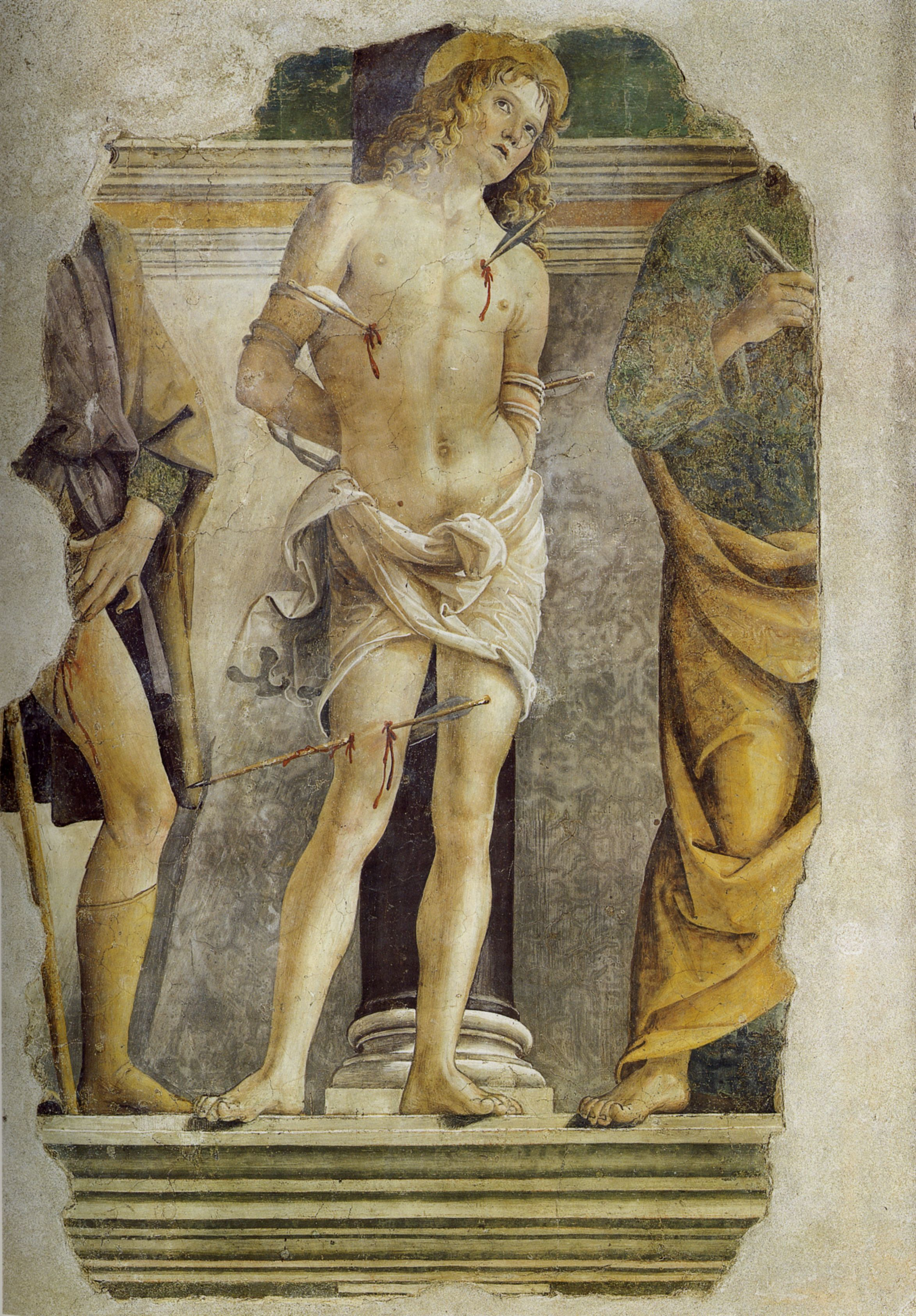
- Artist: Pietro Perugino
- Year: c. 1478
- Medium: Fresco
- Location: Church of Santa Maria Assunta, Cerqueto

Saint Sebastian Between Saints Roch and Peter is a fragment of a fresco by Pietro Perugino, painted around 1478 in the church of Santa Maria Assunta in Cerqueto, Umbria, Italy. It was Perugino's first depiction of Saint Sebastian, a subject to which he would frequently return. To the left is Saint Roch and to the right Saint Peter.

It was originally dated and signed PETRUS PERUSINUS P[INXIT] / A[NNO DOMINI] MCCCCLVIII ('Pietro Perugino painted [this] / Year of Our Lord 1478'). In 1478 Perugino had returned to his native Umbria after a period in Andrea del Verrocchio's studio in Florence. He began to receive important commissions, the success of which was noted by Pope Sixtus IV, who summoned him to Rome. That same year, the Confraternity of Mary Magdalene (Confraternita della Maddalena) summoned him to Cerqueto, near Perugia, where he painted a cycle of frescoes; this is the only surviving fragment from the cycle.

== Bibliography ==
- (in Italian) Vittoria Garibaldi, Perugino, in Pittori del Rinascimento, Scala, Florence, 2004 ISBN 888117099X
