= Delivery of the Keys =

Fresco by Pietro Perugino

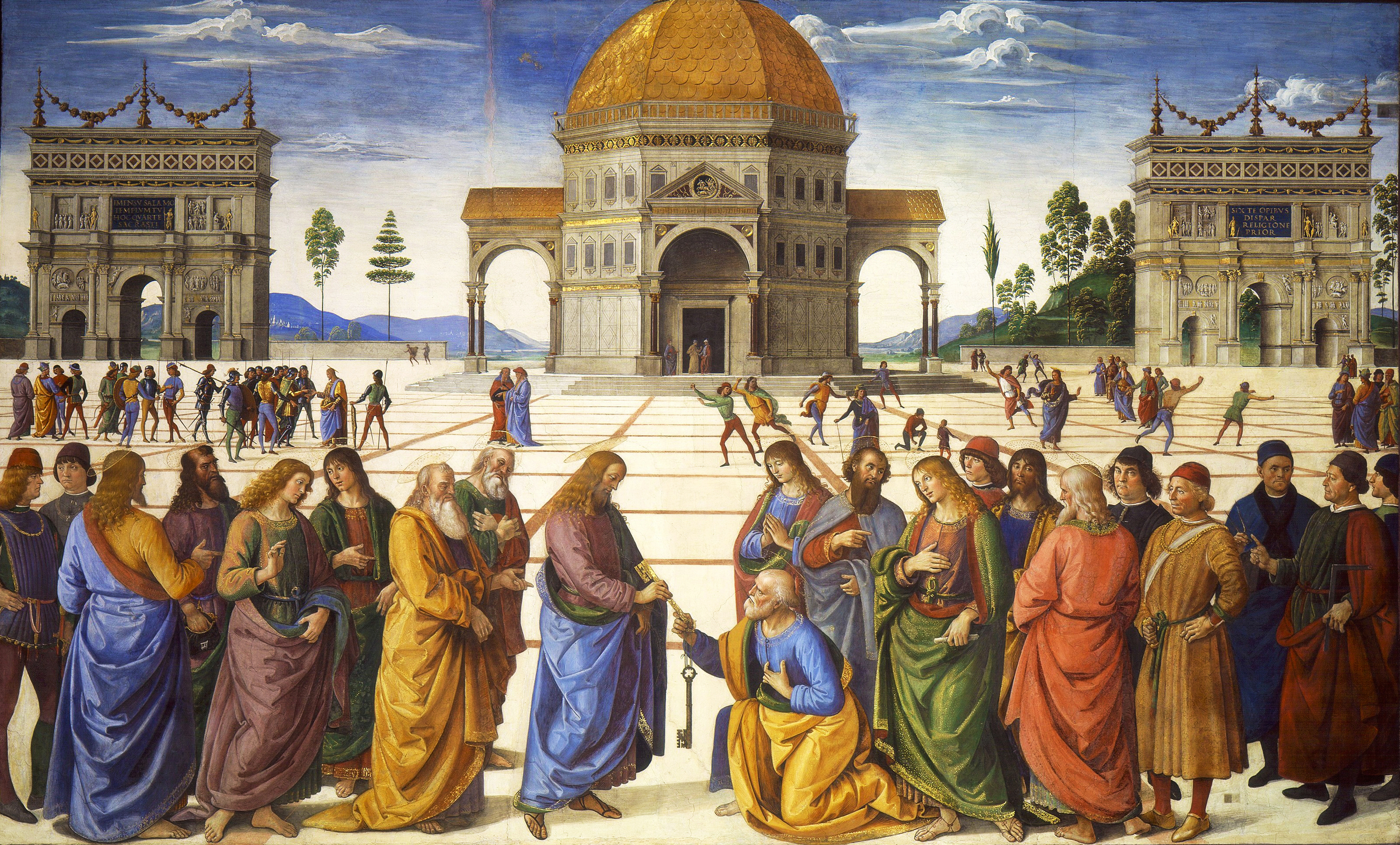
- Artist: Pietro Perugino
- Year: c. 1481–1482
- Type: Fresco
- Dimensions: 330 cm × 550 cm (130 in × 220 in)
- Location: Sistine Chapel, Vatican City

The Delivery of the Keys, or Christ Giving the Keys to Saint Peter is a fresco by the Italian Renaissance painter Pietro Perugino which was produced in 1481–1482 and is located in the Sistine Chapel, Rome.

== History ==
The commission of the work originated in 1480, when Perugino was decorating a chapel in the Old St. Peter's Basilica in Rome. Pope Sixtus IV was pleased by his work, and decided to commission him also the decoration of the new Chapel he had built in the Vatican Palace. Due to the size of the work, Perugino was later joined by a group of painters from Florence, including Botticelli, Ghirlandaio and others.

While the work was still being created, a visit from Alfonso II of Naples resulted in his addition to the far left of the group of foreground figures. To balance out the image, an apostle was added above St. Peter.

== Description ==
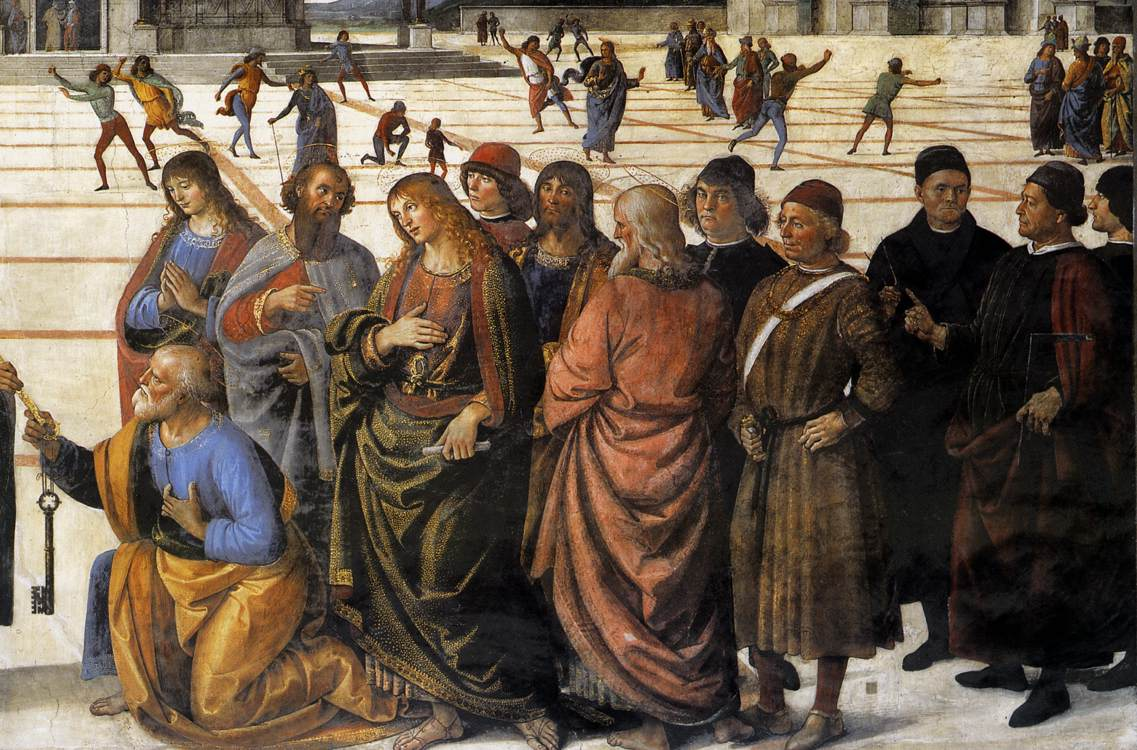
Detail of St. Peter and Apostles

The scene, part of the series of the Stories of Jesus on the chapel's northern wall, is a reference to Matthew 16 in which Jesus says he will give "the keys of the kingdom of heaven" to Saint Peter. These keys represent the power to forgive and to share the word of God thereby giving them the power to allow others into heaven. The main figures are organized in a frieze in two tightly compressed rows close to the surface of the picture and well below the horizon. The principal group, showing Christ handing the silver and gold keys to the kneeling St. Peter, is surrounded by the other Apostles, including Judas (fifth figure to the left of Christ), all with halos, together with portraits of contemporaries, including one said to be a self-portrait (fifth from the right edge). The flat, open square is divided by coloured stones into large foreshortened rectangles. In the center of the background is a temple resembling the ideal church of Leon Battista Alberti's On architecture; on either side are triumphal arches with inscriptions aligning Sixtus IV to Solomon, recalling the latter's porticoed temple. Scattered in the middle distance are two scenes from the life of Christ, including the Tribute Money on the left and the stoning of Christ on the right.

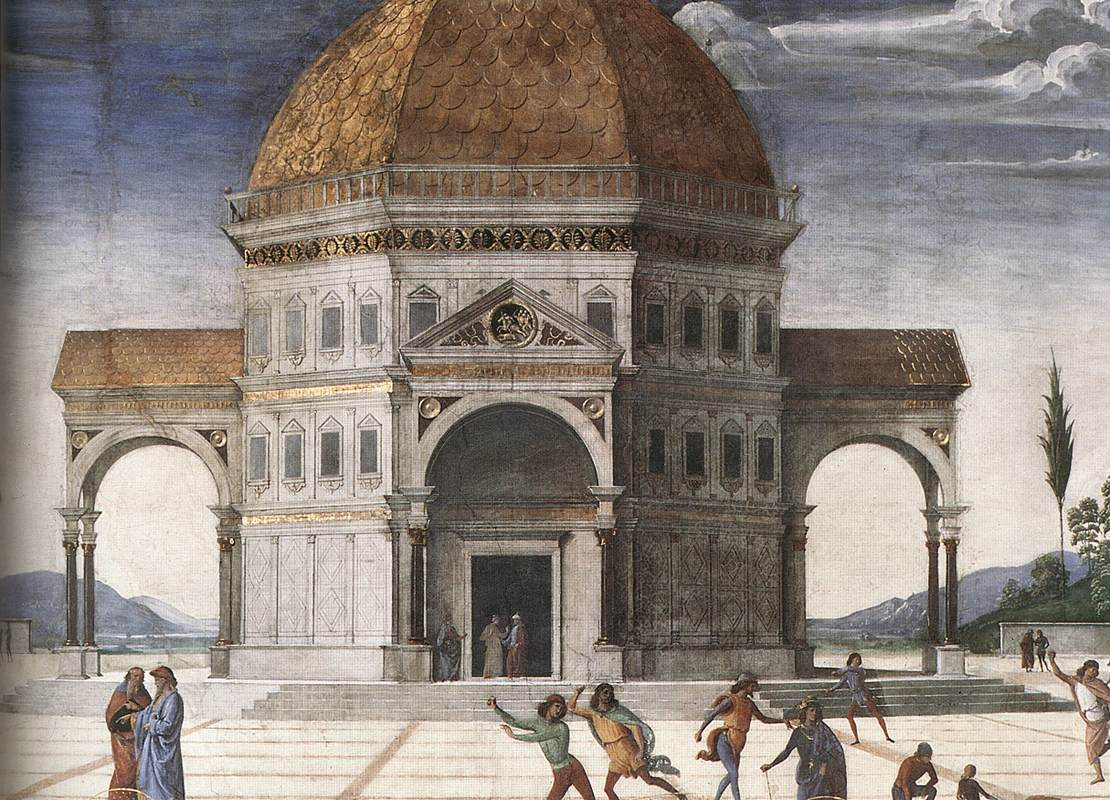
Detail of the central building

The style of the figures is inspired by Andrea del Verrocchio. The active drapery, with its massive complexity, and the figures, particularly several apostles, including St. John the Evangelist, with beautiful features, long flowing hair, elegant demeanour, and refinement recall St Thomas from Verrocchio's bronze group in Orsanmichele. The poses of the actors fall into a small number of basic attitudes that are consistently repeated, usually in reverse from one side to the other, signifying the use of the same cartoon. They are graceful and elegant figures who tend to stand firmly on the earth. Their heads are smallish in proportion to the rest of their bodies, and their features are delicately distilled with considerable attention to minor detail.

The octagonal temple of Jerusalem and its porches that dominates the central axis must have had behind it a project created by an architect, but Perugino's treatment is like the rendering of a wooden model, painted with exactitude. The building with its arches serves as a backdrop in front of which the action unfolds. Perugino has made a significant contribution in rendering the landscape. The sense of an infinite world that stretches across the horizon is stronger than in almost any other work of his contemporaries, and the feathery trees against the cloud-filled sky with the bluish-gray hills in the distance represent a solution that later painters would find instructive, especially Raphael.

The building in the center is similar to that in Marriage of the Virgin by Perugino, as well as that painted by Perugino's pupil Pinturicchio in his Stories of St. Bernardino in the Bufalini Chapel of Santa Maria in Aracoeli.

== Legend ==
The fresco was believed to be a good omen in Papal conclaves: superstition held that the cardinal who (as selected by lot) was housed in the cell beneath the fresco was likely to be elected. Contemporary records indicate at least three popes were housed beneath the fresco during the conclaves that elected them: Pope Clement VII, Pope Julius II, and Pope Paul III.
