= Matteo Balducci =

Italian painter

Matteo Balducci was an Italian painter of the Renaissance. He was born in Fontignano, a small town near Lake Trasimeno in Perugia.

Balducci was an associate of Giovanni Antonio Bazzi between 1517 and 1523. The following year he painted an altar-piece in San Francesco di Pian Castagniano in Monte Amiata in Tuscany. He also painted in churches of Siena, including an Assumption of the Virgin in the Capella Borghesi of Santo Spirito and a Nativity in Santa Maria Maddalena.
