= Portrait of Lorenzo di Credi =

Painting by Perugino

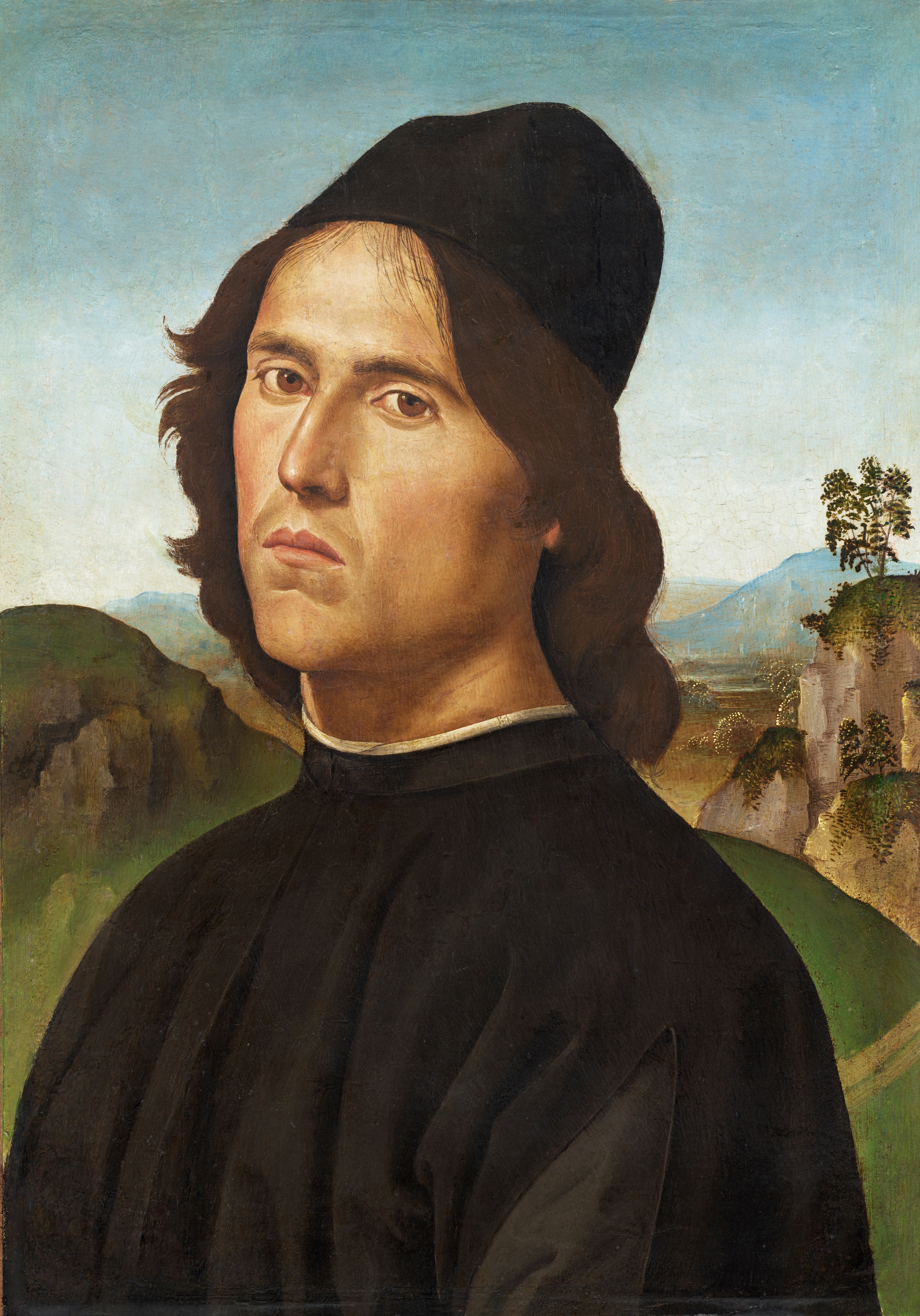
- Artist: Pietro Perugino
- Year: c. 1488
- Type: Tempera on wood transferred to canvas
- Dimensions: 44 cm × 30.5 cm (17 in × 12.0 in)
- Location: National Gallery of Art, Washington, DC

The Portrait of Lorenzo di Credi is a painting by the Italian Renaissance artist Perugino, dating to around 1504 and housed in the National Gallery of Art, Washington, DC, United States.

== Description ==
Before the painting was transferred to canvas, the wooden support had the inscription "Lorenzo di Credi, pittore più eccellente, 1488, età 32 anni, 8 mesi", perhaps added in the 16th century. For centuries, this was thought to be a self-portrait signature: however, starting from the 20th centuries the work was attributed, due to styilistical considerations, to Pietro Perugino (in particular, for the similitarities to the Portrait of Francesco delle Opere at the Uffizi), who had studied with Lorenzo in Verrocchio's workshop.

The painter is portrayed from three-quarters, with a rocky and hilly landscape in the background. He wears a black berret and a blouse of the same color, the collar of a white shirt barely visible at the neck. The melancholic expression, as well as the black clothes, are perhaps connected to the death of the common master Verrocchio, which occurred in 1488.

== See also ==
- Portrait of Perugino

== Sources ==
- Galleria dell'Accademia. Florence: Giunti. 1999. ISBN 88-09-04880-6.
