= Saint Sebastian (Perugino, São Paulo) =

Painting by Perugino

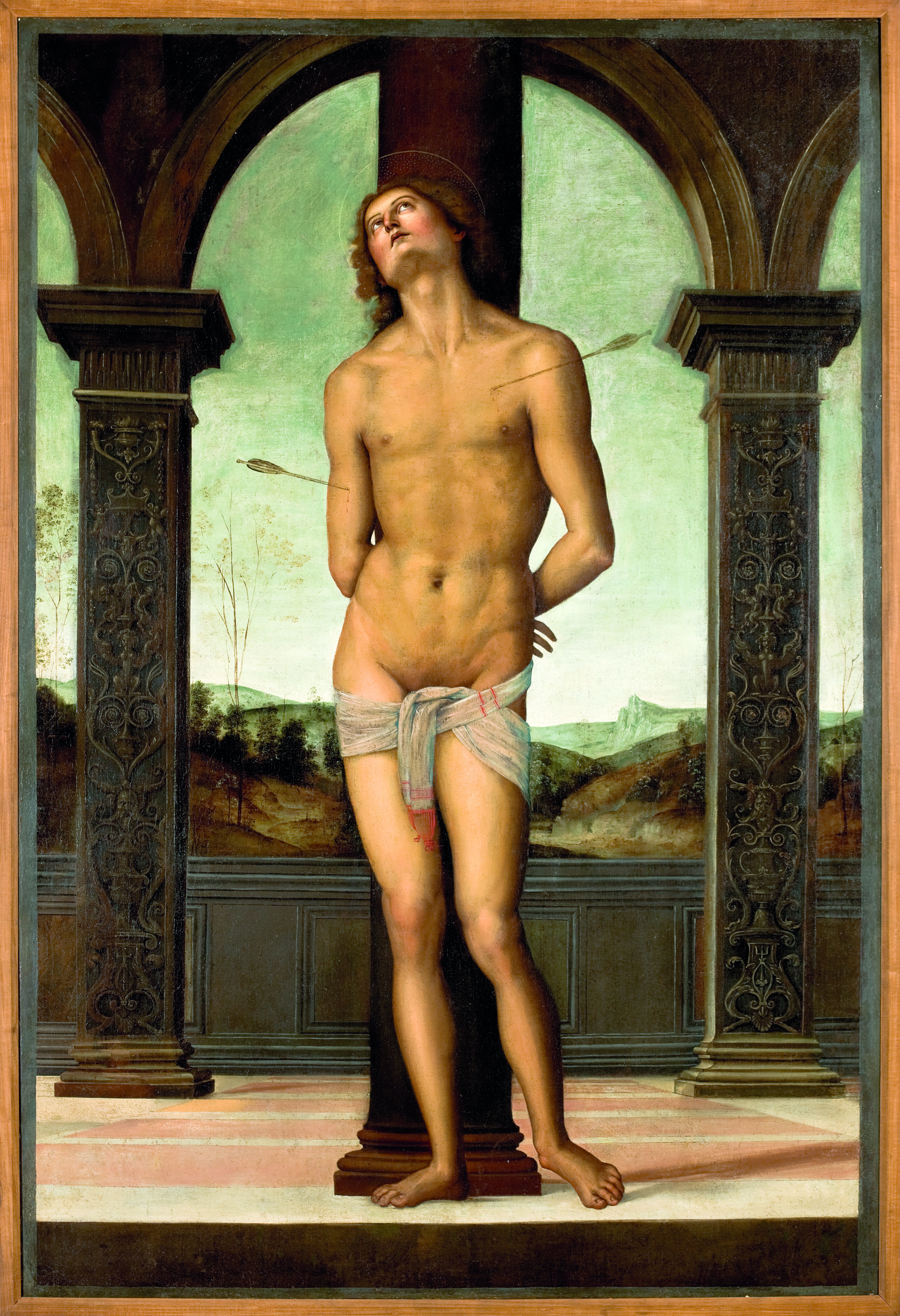
- Artist: Perugino
- Year: c.1507
- Medium: oil on panel
- Location: São Paulo Museum of Art

St Sebastian is a c.1507 painting of St Sebastian by Perugino. It is thought to be an autograph copy of his original in the Louvre - it is near identical to that work, only lacking its inscription and its ruins. It is now in the São Paulo Museum of Art.
