= Fontignano =

Coordinates: 43°001′034″N 12°011′028″E

- Frazione
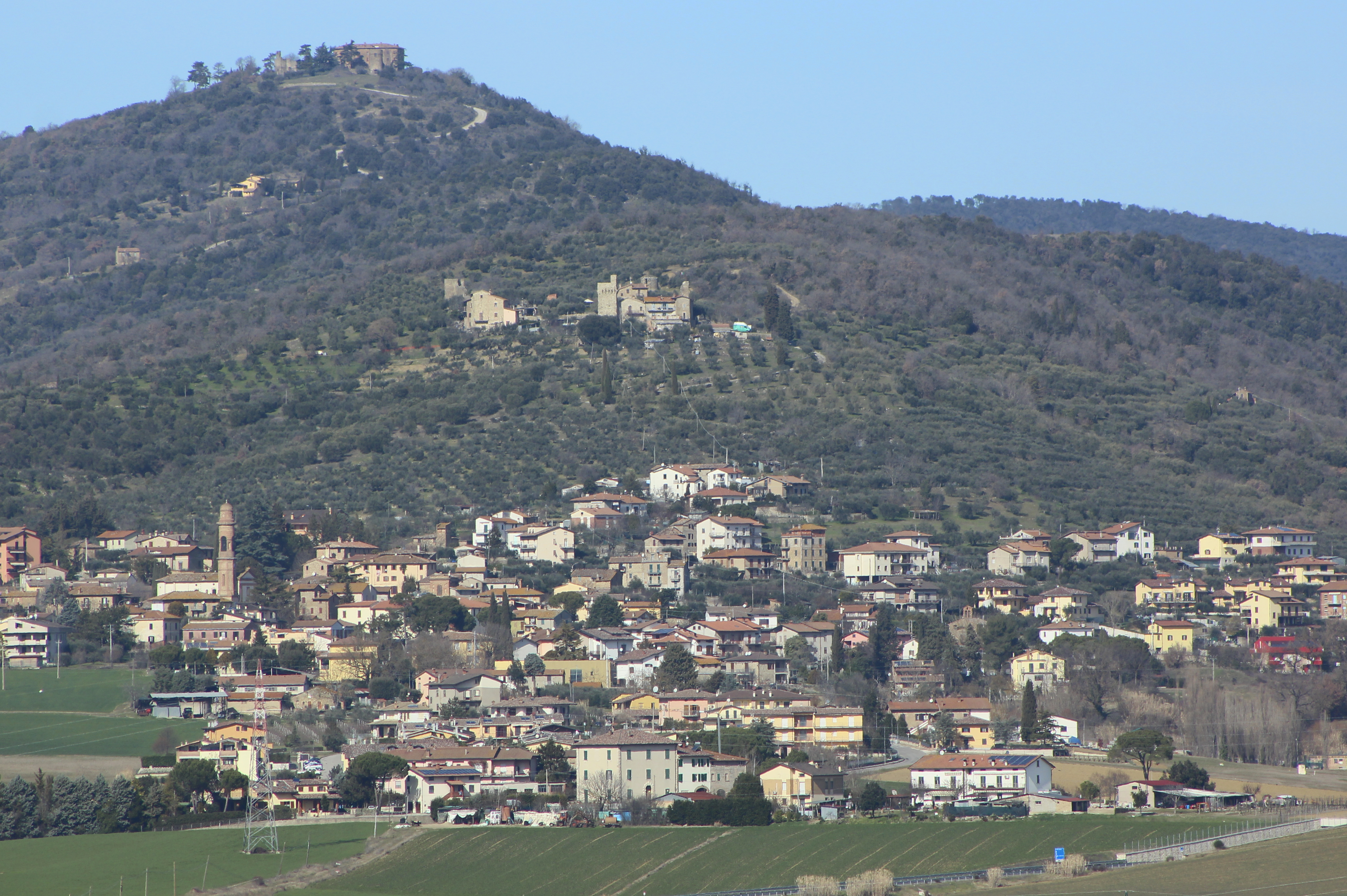

- Location of Fontignano in Italy
- Country: Italy
- Region: Umbria
- Province: Perugia (PG)
- Comune: Perugia
- Time zone: UTC+1 (CET)
  - Summer (DST): UTC+2 (CEST)

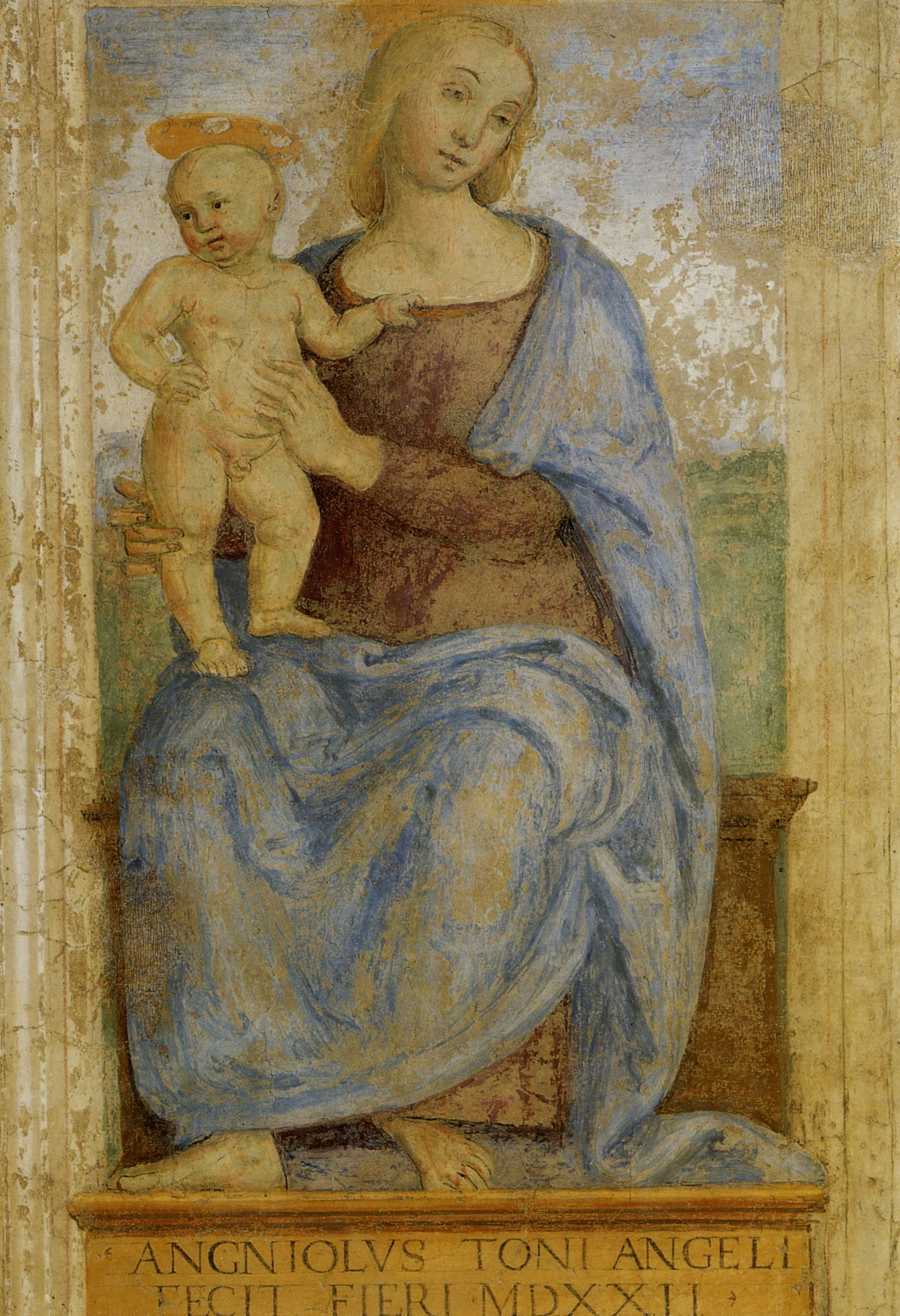
Pietro Perugino's 1522 Madonna and Child fresco at the Oratory of Annunciation in Fontignano

Fontignano is a frazione of the comune of Perugia, Italy, located near Lake Trasimeno.

The famous High Renaissance painter Pietro Perugino died of the plague in Fontignano in 1524 and some of his masterpieces are still preserved in Fontignano.

The Renaissance painter Matteo Balducci was born in Fontignano.
