= Marriage of the Virgin (Perugino) =

Painting by Perugino

The Marriage of the Virgin
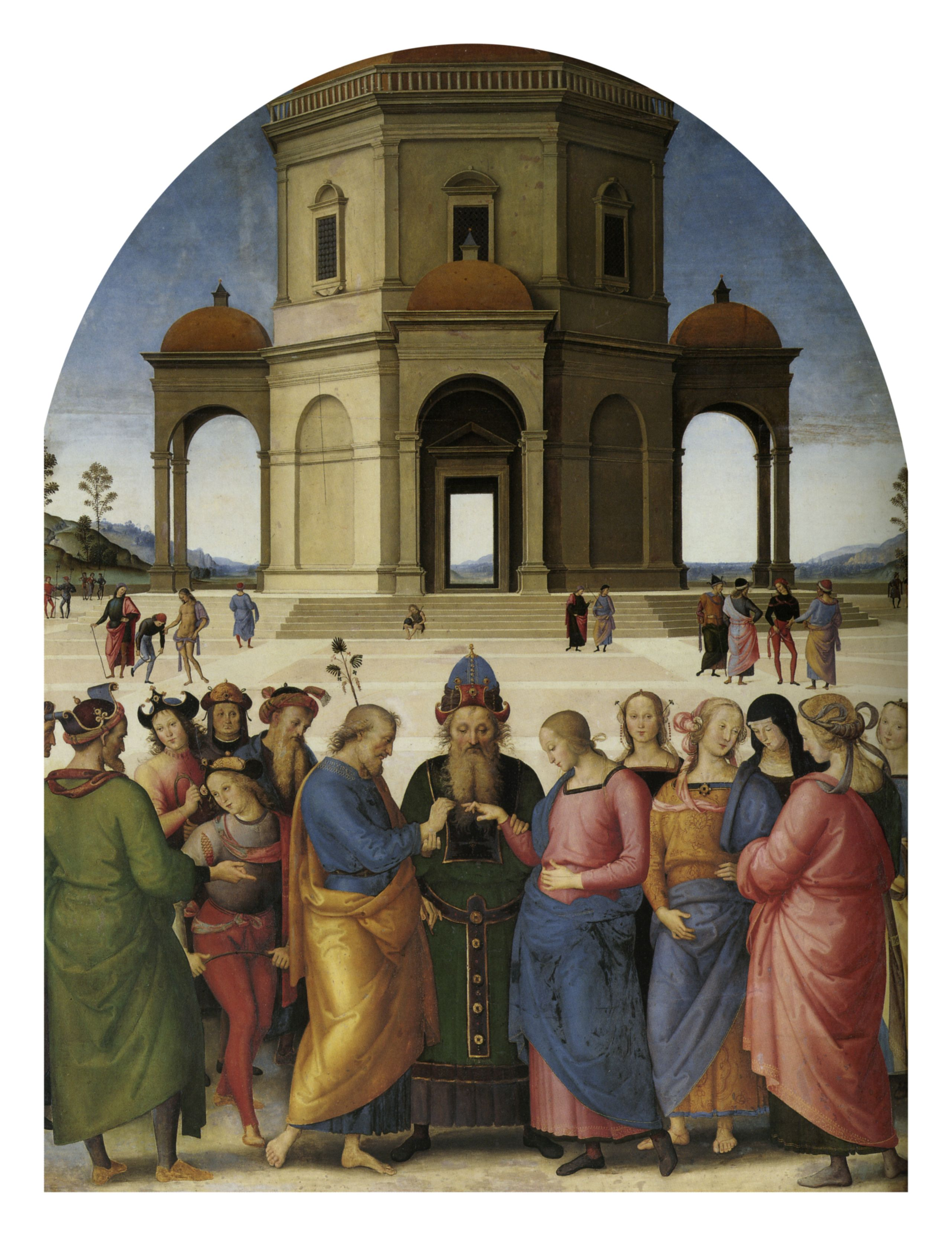
- Artist: Perugino
- Year: 1500–1504
- Type: Oil on wood
- Dimensions: 234 cm × 185 cm (92 in × 73 in)
- Location: Musée des Beaux-Arts de Caen

The Marriage of the Virgin is a painting by the Italian Renaissance master Perugino, although it is now sometimes attributed to his pupil Lo Spagna. It depicts the marriage between Joseph and Mary, and is now in the Musée des Beaux-Arts of Caen, France. Initially commissioned to Pinturicchio for the recently completed cathedral of Perugia, Perugino took over the commission and finished the work around 1500–1504, probably after several periods of stasis.

A very similar composition was painted by unknown artists (sometimes attributed to Fiorenzo di Lorenzo, probable teacher of Perugino or Rocco Zoppo, assistant of Perugino) for the church of San Girolamo in Spello in 1492. Which (if present scholarship is correct) is about ten years earlier than Perugino's and Raphael's treatments of the same subject. The composition of the earlier work does not utilize the elegant central perspective appearing in Perugino's and Raphael's more famous works. However, the figures in the foreground are very similar to both later paintings, including the unmistakable young man breaking the rod.

Later, in 1797, the picture was looted by Napoleon and was subsequently taken to Caen, Normandy. Attempts by the commune of Perugia, and the personal commitment of Antonio Canova, to retrieve the work failed.

The wide perspective of the picture, with at its centre an octagonal edifice and the aligned composition of the figures on the sides, is strongly related to the Perugino's Christ Giving the Keys to St. Peter at the Sistine Chapel. The painting prominently displays the Virgin's engagement ring, which was then kept at the cathedral as a holy relic.

== Sources ==
- Garibaldi, Vittoria (2004). "Perugino". Pittori del Rinascimento (in Italian). Florence: Scala. ISBN 88-8117-099-X.
