= Saint Sebastian (Perugino, Louvre) =

Painting by Perugino

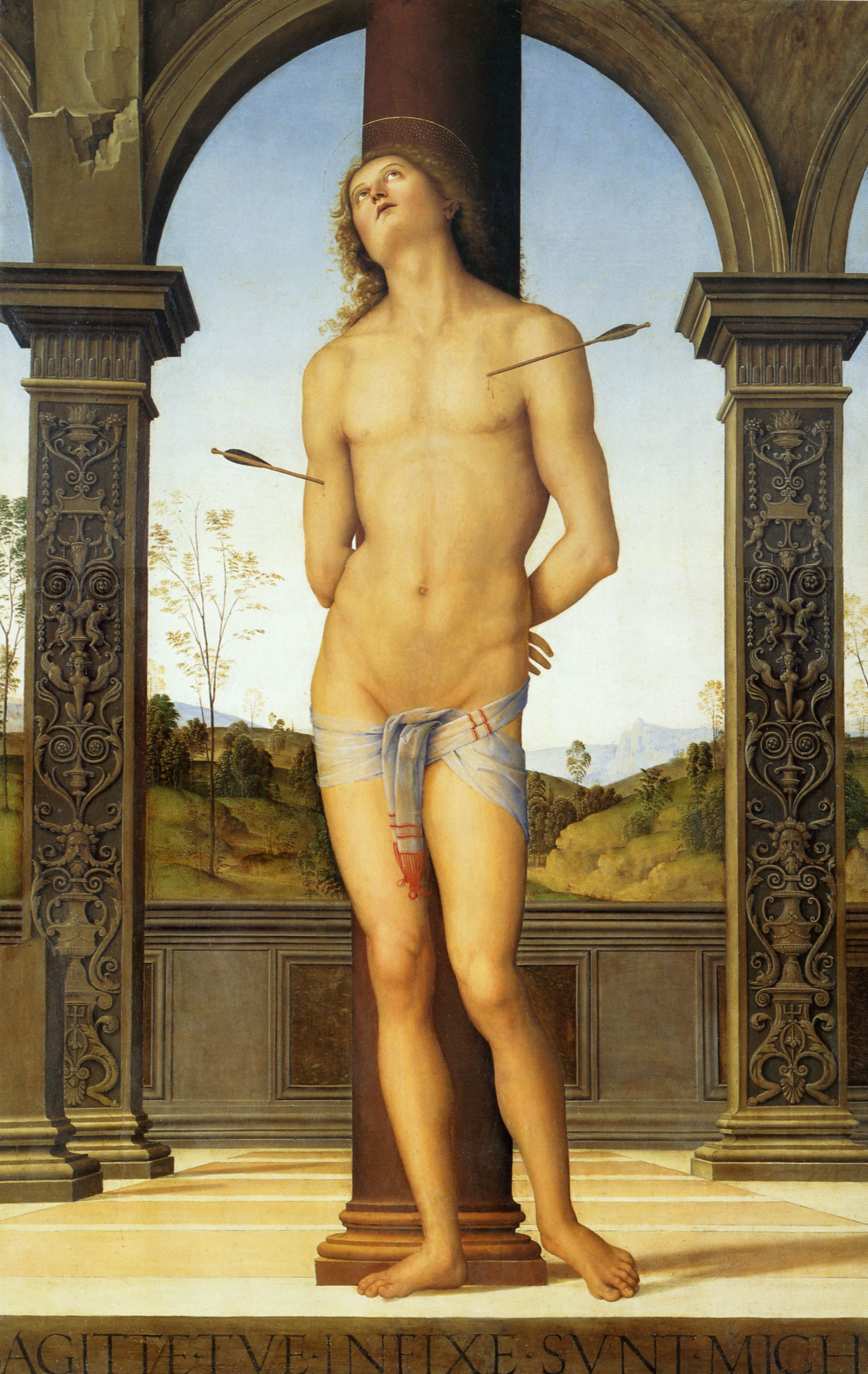
- Artist: Perugino
- Year: 1495
- Medium: oil on oak panel
- Dimensions: 176 cm × 116 cm (69 in × 46 in)
- Location: Louvre, Paris

Saint Sebastian is a c.1495 painting of Saint Sebastian by Perugino, now in the Louvre collection. It was temporarily on display at the Louvre-Lens branch between 2012 and 2017. It is probably the work mentioned in the 17th century inventory of the Barberini collection in Rome, which was later dispersed. Several pieces from it were taken abroad during the 19th century, with St Sebastian being bought by the Louvre in 1896.

It shows the saint in a contrapposto pose drawn from the Doryphoros of Polykleitos, echoed in a later autograph copy now in São Paulo. The symmetrical composition draws on Perugino's earlier works - he first used the motif in St Sebastian between St Roch and St Peter, a fresco painted in Cerqueto near Perugia. He stands on a terrace beneath a monumental arch with grotesque-decorated pilasters and a balustrade. On the base of the platform is the Latin inscription "SAGITTAE. TUAE.INFIXAE. SUNT. MICHI", drawn from Psalm 38:2 ("Thy arrows are fixed in me"). The deep landscape background is typical of the artist, with wooded hills and mountains. To the left are a ruined vault and pillar, symbolising the downfall of the pagan world.

== Bibliography ==
- (in Italian) Vittoria Garibaldi, Perugino, in Pittori del Rinascimento, Scala, Florence, 2004 ISBN 888117099X
