= Saint Sebastian (Perugino, Hermitage) =

Painting by Pietro Perugino

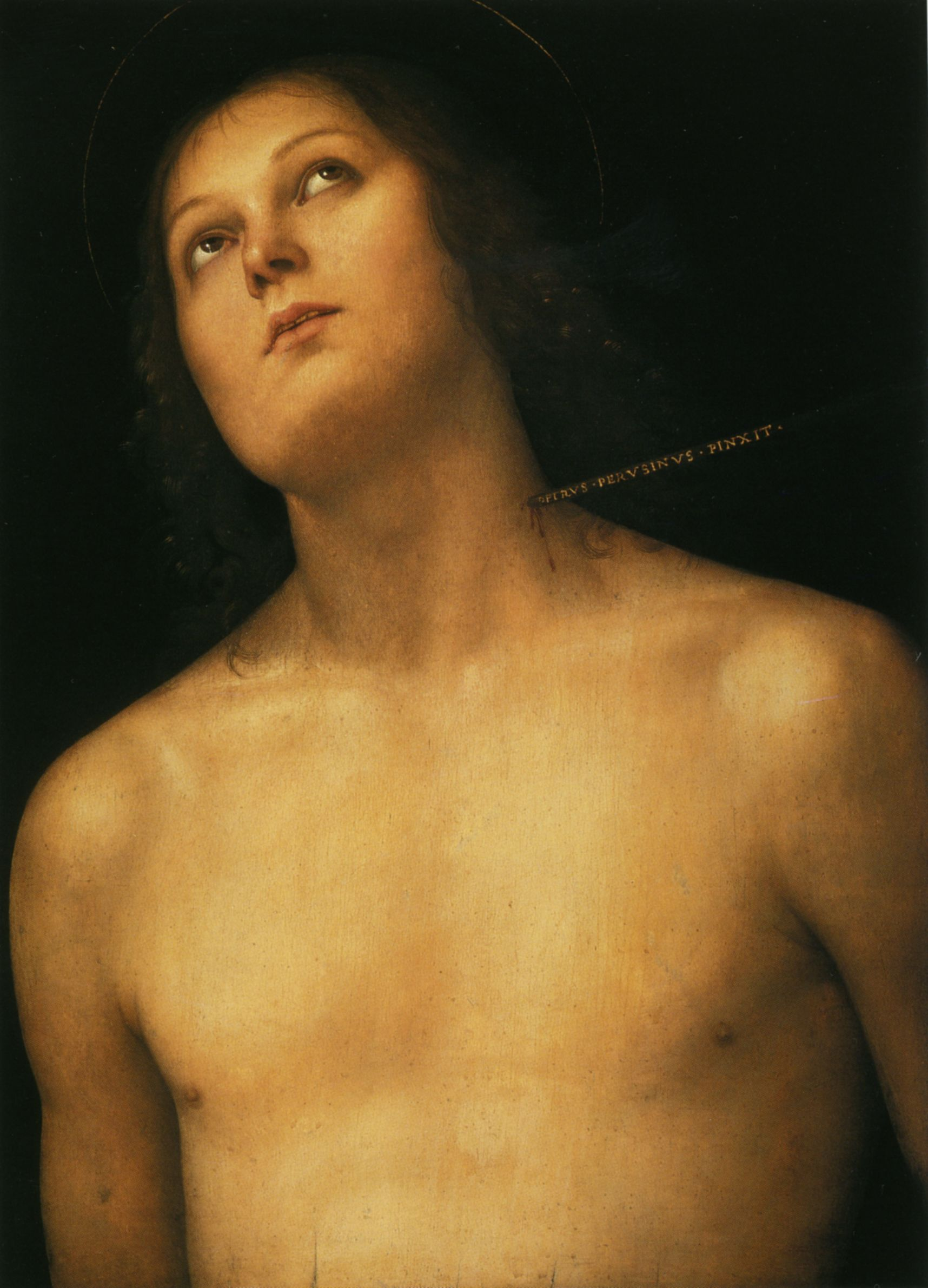
- Artist: Perugino
- Year: 1493–1494
- Medium: oil on panel
- Dimensions: 53.3 cm × 39.5 cm (21.0 in × 15.6 in)
- Location: Hermitage, St Petersburg

St Sebastian is one of several paintings of Saint Sebastian by Perugino. It shows him three-quarter length and is signed "P[I]E[T]RUS PERUSINUS PINXIT" (Peter of Perugia painted [this]) on the arrow in his neck. It was painted in 1493–1494. It is now in the Hermitage Museum in St Petersburg.
