= Portrait of Perugino =

16th-century painting

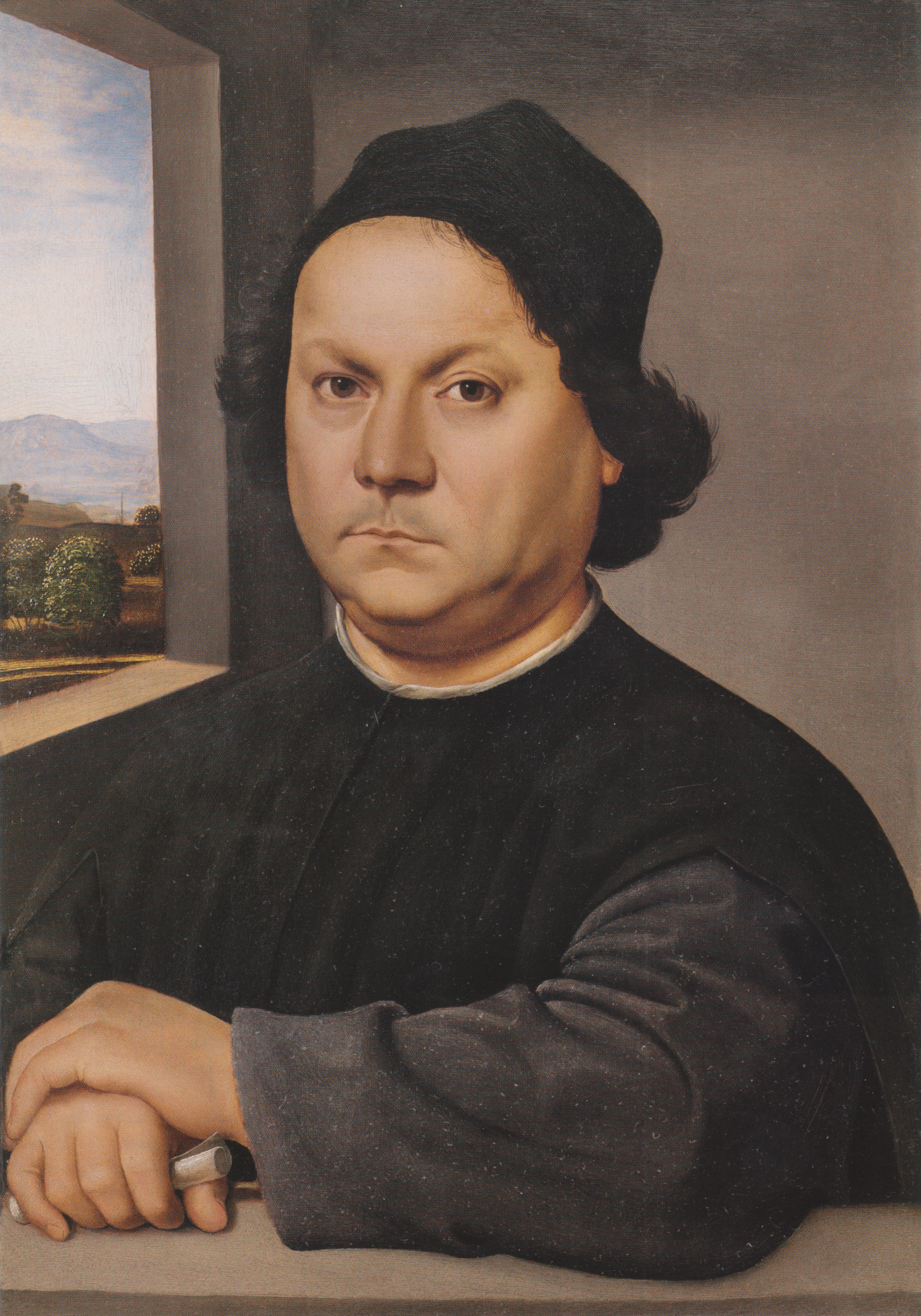
- Artist: Raphael or Lorenzo di Credi
- Year: c. 1504
- Medium: Tempera on wood
- Dimensions: 57 cm × 42 cm (22 in × 17 in)
- Location: Uffizi, Florence

The Portrait of Perugino is a portrait of the Italian Renaissance artist Perugino attributed to his pupil Raphael or to Lorenzo di Credi. It was produced around 1504 and is now in the Uffizi gallery, Florence.

== History ==
The painting is known to have been in the Florentine Galleries since as early as 1704, when it was identified as a portrait of Martin Luther and was attributed to Hans Holbein the Younger. In an 1825 comment to Giorgio Vasari's Vite, it was listed as a Portrait of Verrocchio by Lorenzo di Credi. Adolfo Venturi in 1922 attributed it to Perugino himself, while the attribution to Raphael appeared in the 1930s.

The identification with Perugino is today ascertained thanks to the evident similarities with the self-portrait in the Collegio del Cambio. Copies of the painting exist in Vienna, London, Bergamo, Rome and in the Gallerie dell'Accademia in Venice.

== See also ==
- Portrait of Lorenzo di Credi
