= Fiorenzo di Lorenzo =

Italian painter (c. 1440–1522)

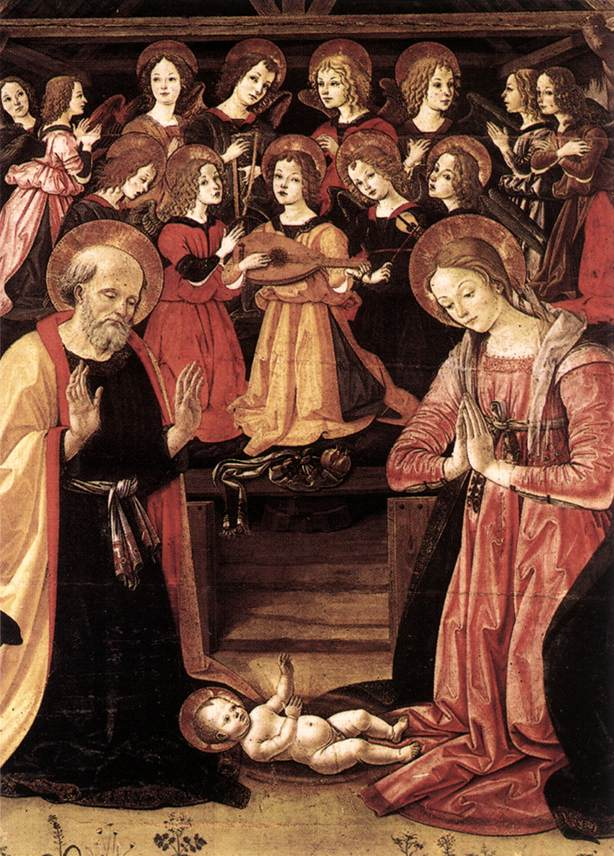
The Adoration of the Magi (c. 1490) Tempera on panel, 151 x 209 cm Galleria Nazionale dell'Umbria, Perugia

Fiorenzo di Lorenzo (c. 1440 – 1522) was an Italian painter, of the Umbrian school. He lived and worked at Perugia, where most of his authentic works are still preserved in the Galleria Nazionale dell'Umbria.

Of his birth, death and pupilage, little is known: he may have been trained in the circles of Niccolò Alunno, Benedetto Bonfigli and Bartolomeo Caporali. Between 1463 and 1469, his name appears on the register of painters of Perugia. Documentary evidence shows that he was decemvir of Perugia and, In the same year, he entered into a contract to paint an altarpiece for the church of Santa Maria Nuova, the pentaptych of the Madonna and Saints. Fiorenzo is also known from a few signed works, including the Madonna of Della Midericordia (1476) and a niche with lunette, two wings and predella (1487). Other works which have been attributed to di Lorenzo include a Pietà with Saints Jerome and Leonard in San Pietro (1469), a Pieta above the door of the Sala di Fiorenzo in Perugia (1472 - now attributed to Pintoricchio), a fresco of Saints Romano and Rocco in the Church of San Francesco in Deruta (1477-8, now attributed to Perugino), an Annunciation fresco on the outside of the Portiuncula at Assisi (1486 - now attributed to Perugino or his workshop), and two frescoes in the church of Santa Maria di Monteluce (1491 and ca. 1499).

Renaissance art biographer Giorgio Vasari does not even mention Fiorenzo's name, though he probably refers to him when he says that Cristofano, Perugino's father, sent his son to be the shop drudge of a painter in Perugia, who was "no great master of his profession, but held in great veneration both the art and the men who were excellent therein." It is certain that the early works of both Perugino and Pinturicchio show certain mannerisms which point towards Fiorenzo's influence, if not to his direct teaching.

The list of fifty pictures which have been ascribed to Fiorenzo includes works of such widely varied character that the scholars' suggestions of the masters under whom Fiorenzo is supposed to have studied varies. Pisanello, Verrocchio, Benozzo Gozzoli, Antonio del Pollaiuolo, Benedetto Bonfigli, Andrea Mantegna, Francesco Squarcione, Filippo Lippi, Luca Signorelli and Domenico Ghirlandaio have all been suggested.

According to the Encyclopædia Britannica Eleventh Edition (Konody 1911):

Fiorenzo's authentic works are remarkable for their sense of space and for the expression of that peculiar clear, soft atmosphere which is so marked a feature in the work of Perugino. But Fiorenzo has an intensity of feeling and a power of expressing character which are far removed from the somewhat affected grace of Perugino. Of the forty-five pictures bearing Fiorenzo's name in the Pinacoteca of Perugia, the eight charming St Bernardino panels are so different from his well-authenticated works, so Florentine in conception and movement, that the Perugian's authorship is very questionable.
