= Palazzo dei Priori =

Coordinates: 43.112°N 12.389°E

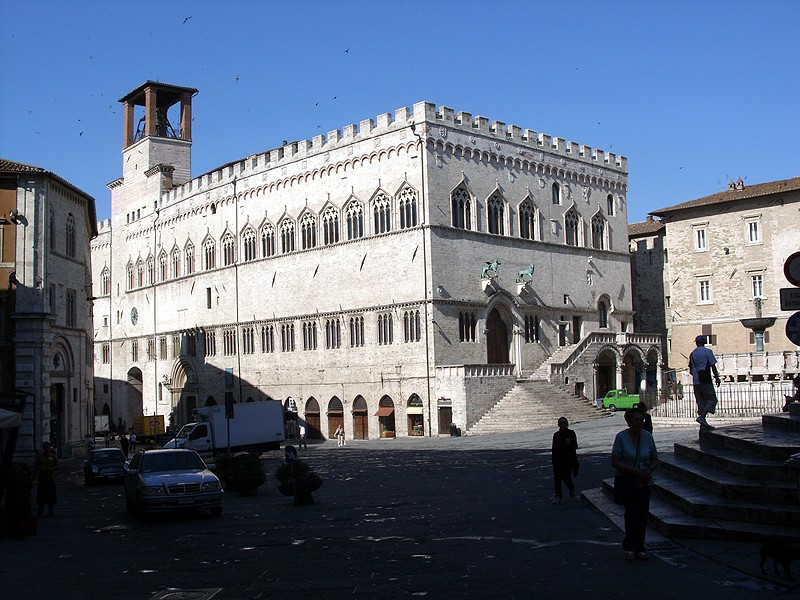

General information
- Status: The building is well-preserved and renovated
- Architectural style: Gothic
- Location: Piazza IV Novembre, Perugia, Italy
- Construction started: 1293
- Construction stopped: 1443

The Palazzo dei Priori or comunale is one of the best examples in Italy of a public palace from the communal era (11th century). It is located in the central Piazza IV Novembre in Perugia, Umbria. It extends along Corso Vannucci up to Via Boncambi. It still houses part of the municipality, and, on the third floor, the Galleria Nazionale dell'Umbria. It takes its name from the Priori, the highest political authority governing the city in the medieval era.

== History and architecture ==
It was built in Gothic style between 1293 and 1443, in several phases. The irregularity of the facade is explained by the long construction, due to constant additions and the incorporation of earlier buildings.

The oldest part is the one that houses the Sala dei Notari, that is, the corner part between Piazza IV Novembre and Corso Vannucci. It displays three trifora windows with a trefoil portal on the side facing the square and ten triforas and four-light windows facing the Corso.

It was the first building site, between 1293 and 1297, by the architects Jacopo di Servadio and Giovannello di Benvenuto, both from Perugia.

In the early 1300s, the entire Palazzo Capitano del Popolo, formerly the tower house of Madonna Dialdiana, was incorporated into the west side, that is, the hidden side of the palace.

The subsequent expansion was managed, between 1317 and 1326, by the architect Ambrogio Maitani from Siena who, with his brother Lorenzo, was hired to refurbish the Montepacciano aqueduct, which carried the water to the fountain in the square. During this same period, lodgings were built for the new Magistracy of Priori (founded in 1303, consisting of ten representatives of each one of the main guilds of the arts, among the 44 that existed; they held office for only two months, in which they were housed in the palace). Their living quarters consisted of the dormitories and council rooms on the first floor, the kitchen and the dining hall on the second floor and the main hall on the third. Those locations were used starting in 1325, the same period in which the Portale Maggiore was built, which became the palace's main entrance.

Between 1326 and 1331 the comune purchased from Benvenuto di Cola dei Servitori a tower house, which was connected to the palace by an overpass, above the present-day Via dei Priori. On the old tower was built a bell tower. In 1331, the ancient Priori Chapel (Cappella dei Priori) was built here, consecrated to Saint Louis of Toulouse, brother of Robert of Anjou, belonging to the House of Anjou allied with the comune; for this reason, the carved lily emblem appears on the lunette of the portal and the side of the palace, along Via dei Priori at the intersection with Via della Gabbia.

In 1335, the facade was further extended, breaking the initial symmetry with the portico and San Severo hall on the ground floor and of the other halls on the upper floors. In the expansion, the church of San Severo di Piazza, of which only one wall remains inside, was incorporated into the palace (the title of the Church of San Severo was added to the nearby church of Sant'Agata, in Via dei Priori, which still retains the dual appellation).

Between 1429 and 1443 the palace was again enlarged southward, incorporating the church of San Giovanni al foro o di piazza, now the chapel of San Giovanni, part of Collegio del Cambio, i.e., the guild of the money changers, which took over the palace from 1452. For stylistic homogeneity the Gothic style has been retained, even though it was no longer used in the 15th century.

From 1534 the palace housed the apostolic legate (an emissary of the Pope) and there were changes made to the most recent wing of the palace. The architect Galeazzo Alessi designed the internal and external arcade in the 1580s. Later the architect and sculptor Vincenzo Danti completed the work by enlarging the interior staircase.

In the following years of papal rule, the palace underwent a period of decay and was greatly altered both inside and out (the crenellation disappeared, new windows were opened and the triforas disappeared). It was restored to its old form and restored after 1860.

== Description ==
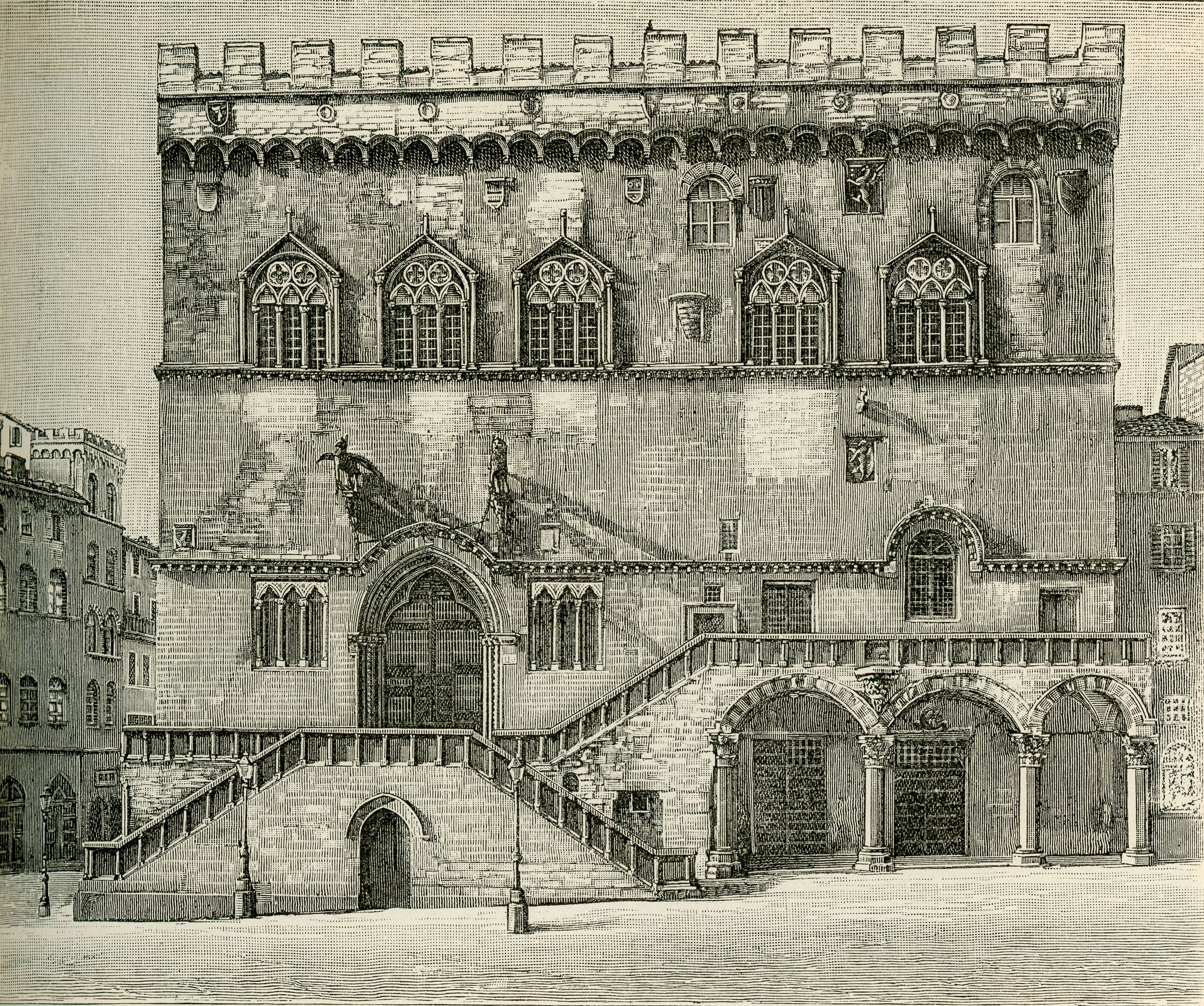
The facade of the palace in 1895

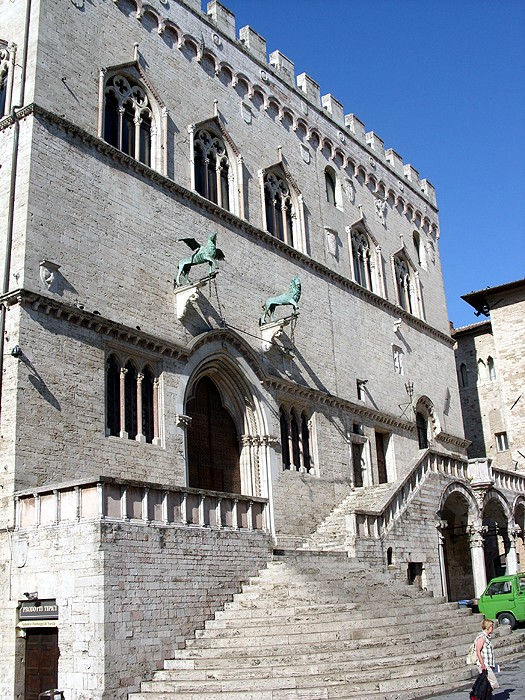
The facade of the palace facing Piazza IV Novembre

=== External facades ===
The facade facing the square has a fan-shaped stairway built in 1902 to replace the two-flight staircase dating from the 17th century. The original one is presumed to have been fan-shaped. The trefoil Gothic portal is flanked by two triforas, the same as the five above, which have a pinnacle on top. The two on the right were added during the subsequent extension. On the ground floor, there are three asymmetrical arches; between the first two is a pulpit used for the reading of the edicts. Two large corbels above the Gothic portal support copies of bronze statues of the griffin, symbol of the city, and the Guelph lion; the originals (now in the entrance hall of the palace) were made in 1274, probably for a vanished fountain by Arnolfo di Cambio. The chains hanging from the statue and the iron bar are those taken from the gates of Torrita di Siena by Perugian soldiers during the Battle of Torrita in 1358.

The facade toward the Corso, with a bulging progression, allows a glimpse of the various extensions that have taken place over time. The walls on the first floor are decorated, as well as the facade on the square, by triforas and two examples of quatrefoil windows, while on the upper floor are 19 triforas with a pinnacle combining the colour of the white and pink stone. The Guelph cornice and crenellations crown the end of both sides. On the ground floor, shops replace the fondachi (warehouses) and artisan workshops. To the right of the portal is still the entrance of Collegio della Mercanzia, occupying part of the palace from 1390, while the Collegio del Cambio took over the southern extension, where it has been since 1452.

==== Portale Maggiore ====
The Portale Maggiore or Portale delle arti, the dominant element of the building, attributed to local workers, was built in 1346. Rich in sculptural decoration, it is flanked by square pillars resting on two lions, the one on the left representing magnanimity, fertility and pride, and the one on the right representing of avarice, abundance and humility. On top of the pillars are two griffins, overlooking calves, the symbol of Corporazione dei Macellai (the guild of butchers), which commissioned the work. On the framing of the portal and the archway are bas-reliefs representing scenes of city life. In the lunette are copies of the statues of saints Lawrence, Herculanus of Perugia, and Constantius of Perugia (or Saint Louis of Toulouse), patron saints of the city. The style and the size of the portal are in contrast with those of the palace; for this reason, it is thought to have been constructed for an ecclesiastical building, but was later used for Palazzo dei Priori. On the left side of the portal is a figure with a title that reads: Entra Puro, move securo ('Come thither, be safe').

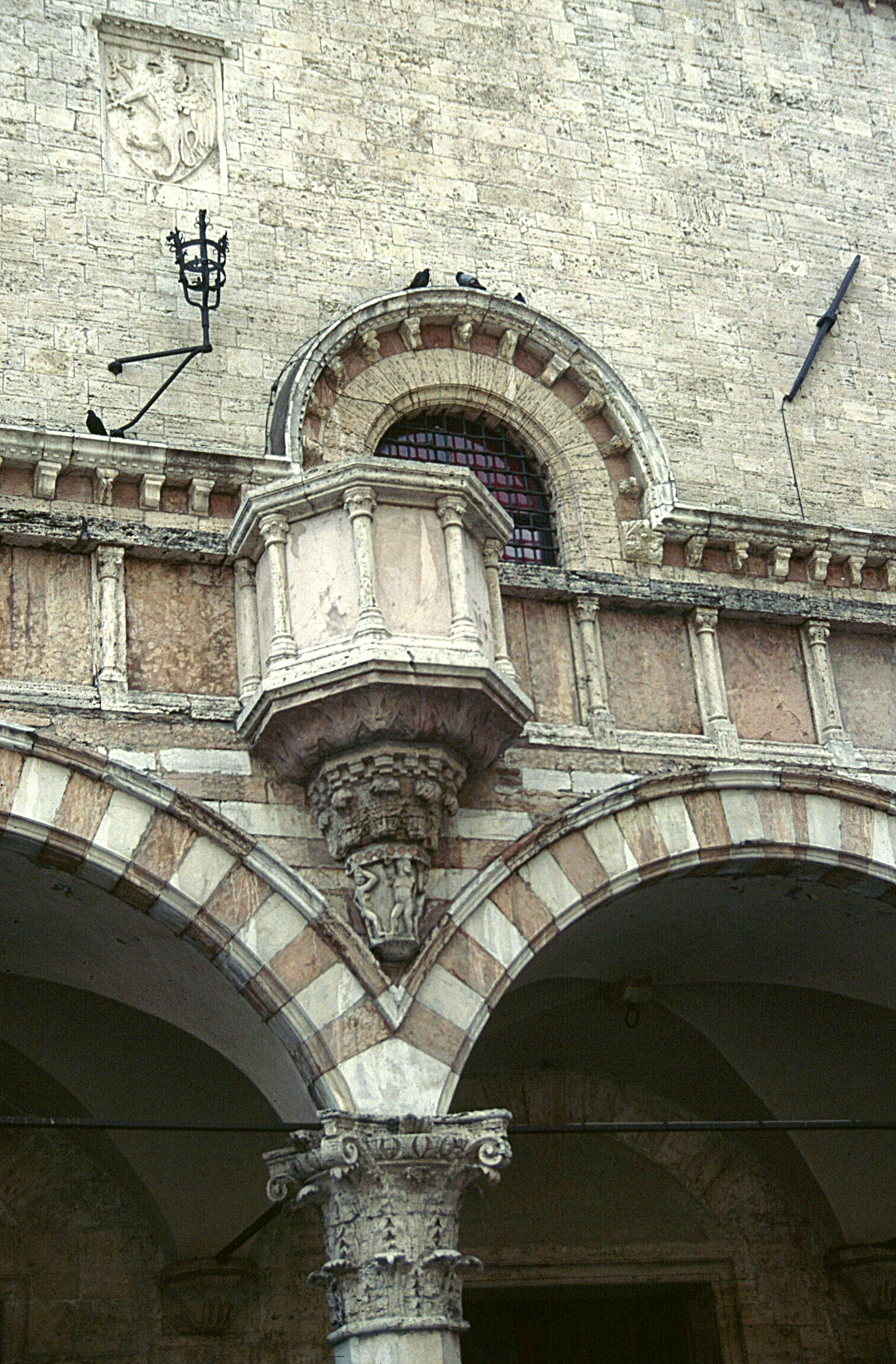
The pulpit

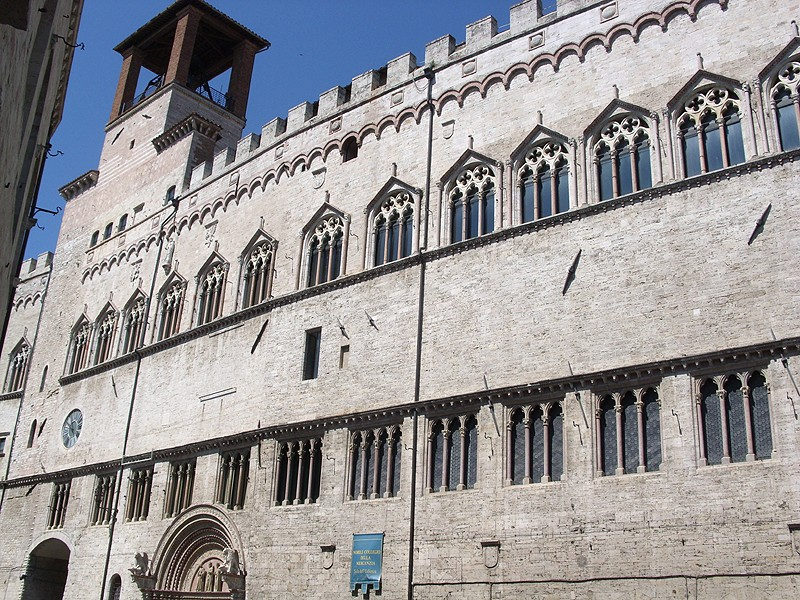
The facade toward Corso Vannucci

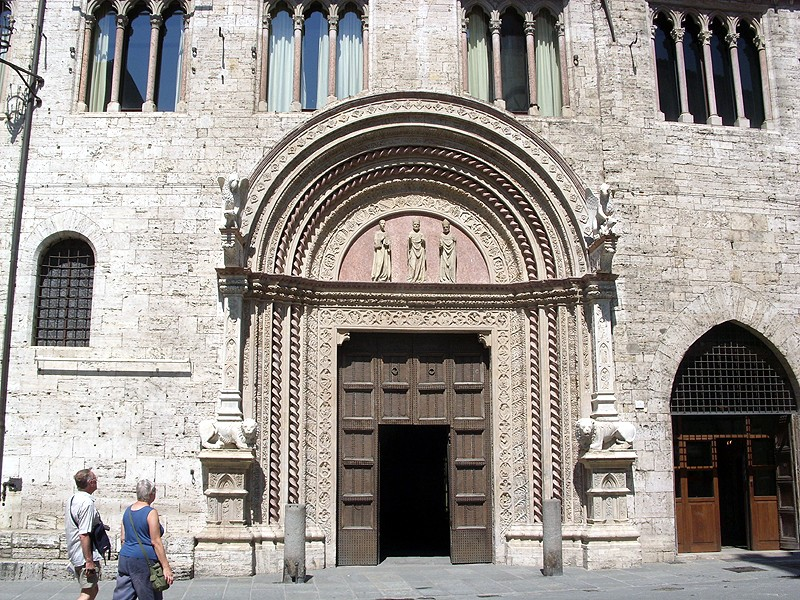
The Portale maggiore

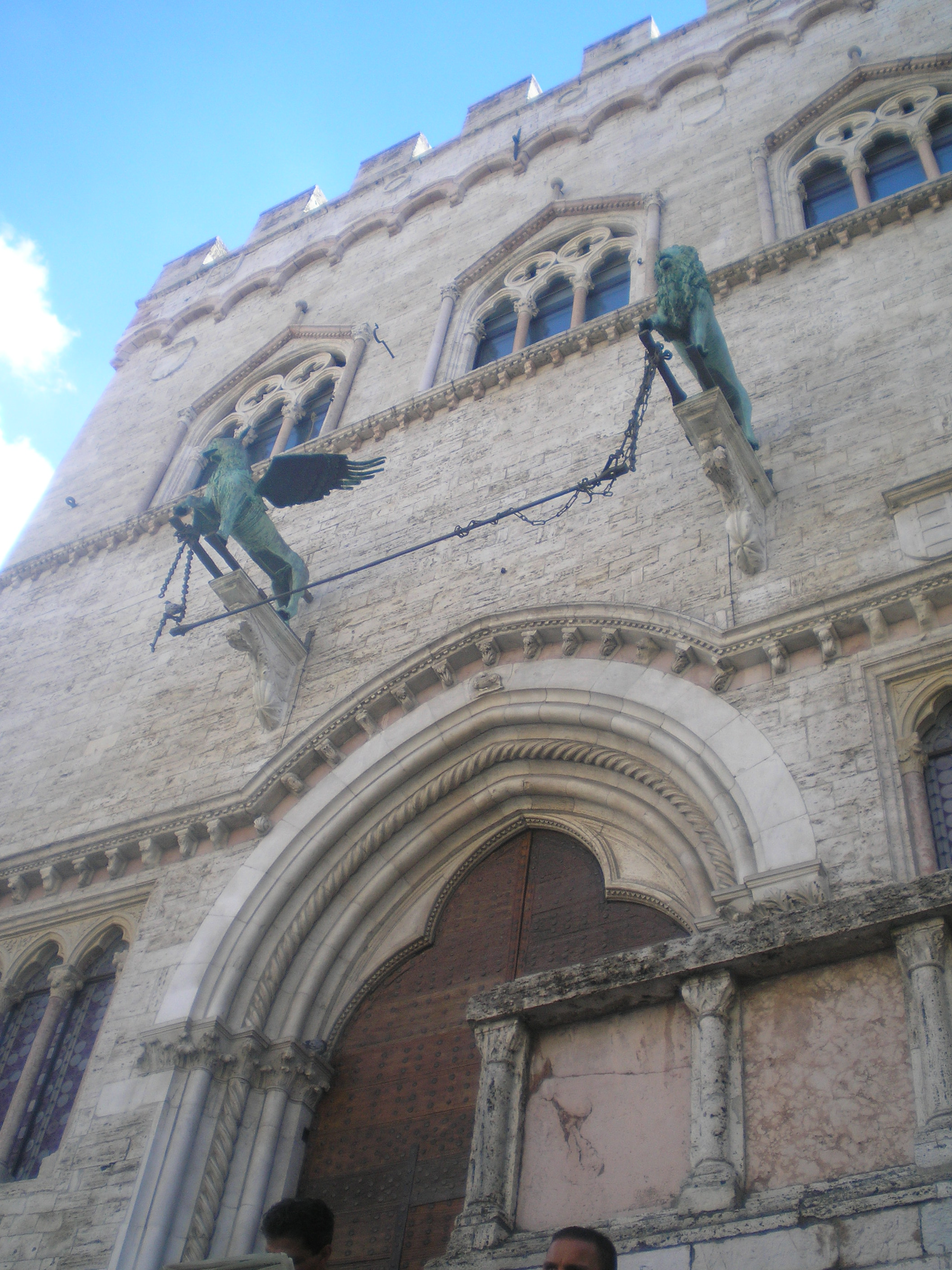
A Griffin and a Lion, symbols of the city, decorate the entrance from Piazza della fontana

=== Interior ===
The interior contains several locations of notable interest.

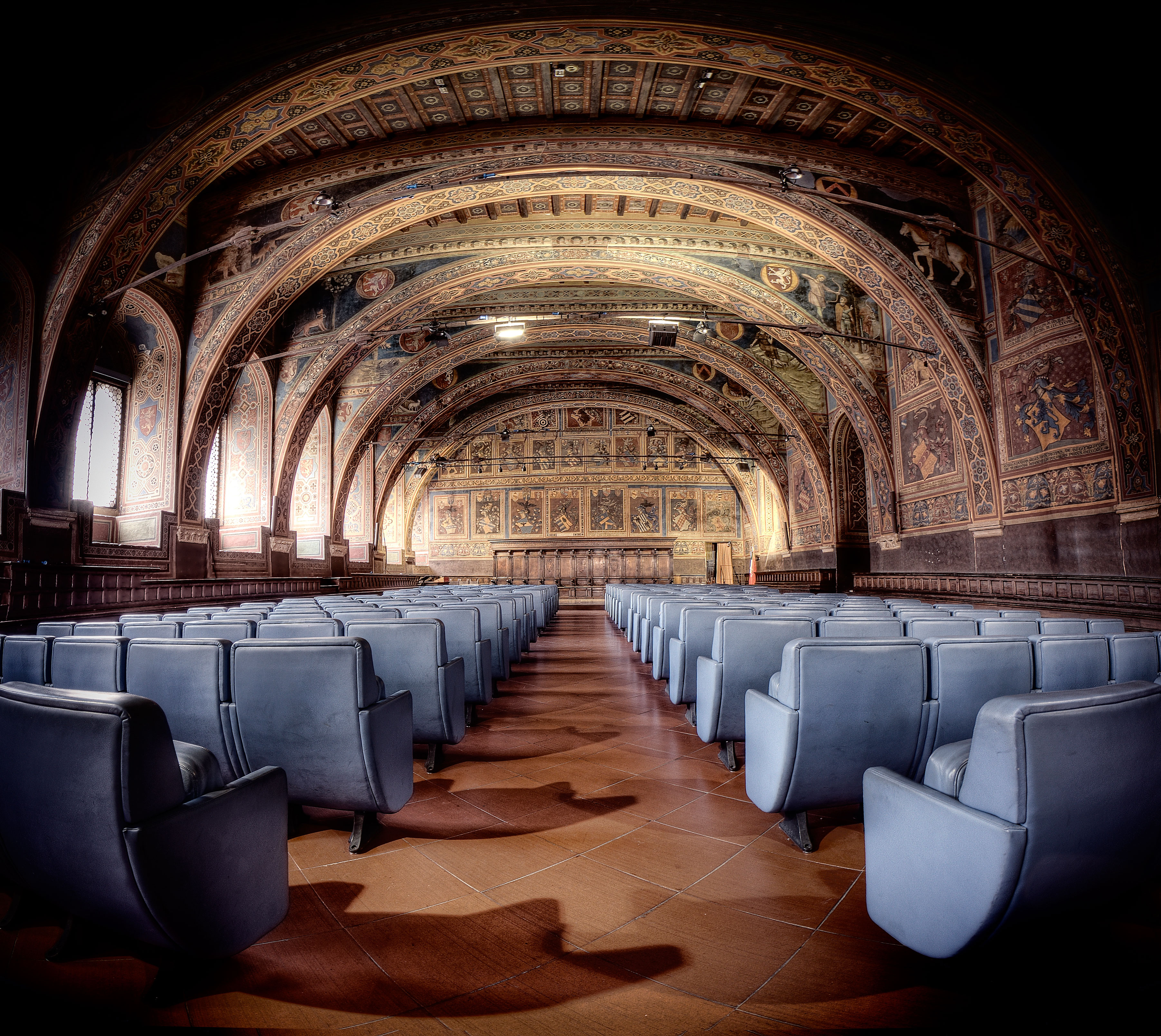
The Sala dei Notari

==== Notari Hall ====
The Sala dei Notari is located on the north side of the building. Originally a hall for the popular assemblies of the free comune, it was also the seat of the court of the capitano del popolo. From 1582 it was the seat of the powerful guild of the Notari, from which it takes its name.

The vast room with vaults supported by eight arches is decorated with frescoes dating back to the last decade of the 13th century, attributed to the Maestro del Farneto and to the Maestro Espressionista di Santa Chiara, both connected to the frescoes of the Basilica of Saint Francis of Assisi. They represent Aesop's Fables, legends, biblical stories and maxims. In 1860 the frescoes were heavily restored by Perugian artist Matteo Tassi, who added neo-Gothic and eclectic decorations throughout, and repainted the emblems of successive podestà and capitani del popolo in the city's government. Two emblems of the magistrates in office between 1293 and 1297, frescoed on the counter-facade of the hall, confirm the date of the building's construction. Along the perimeter is a line of seats, reconstructed in the 19th century based on the original 16th-century models. At the top, on the right wall was a passage connecting to the residence of the capitano del popolo.

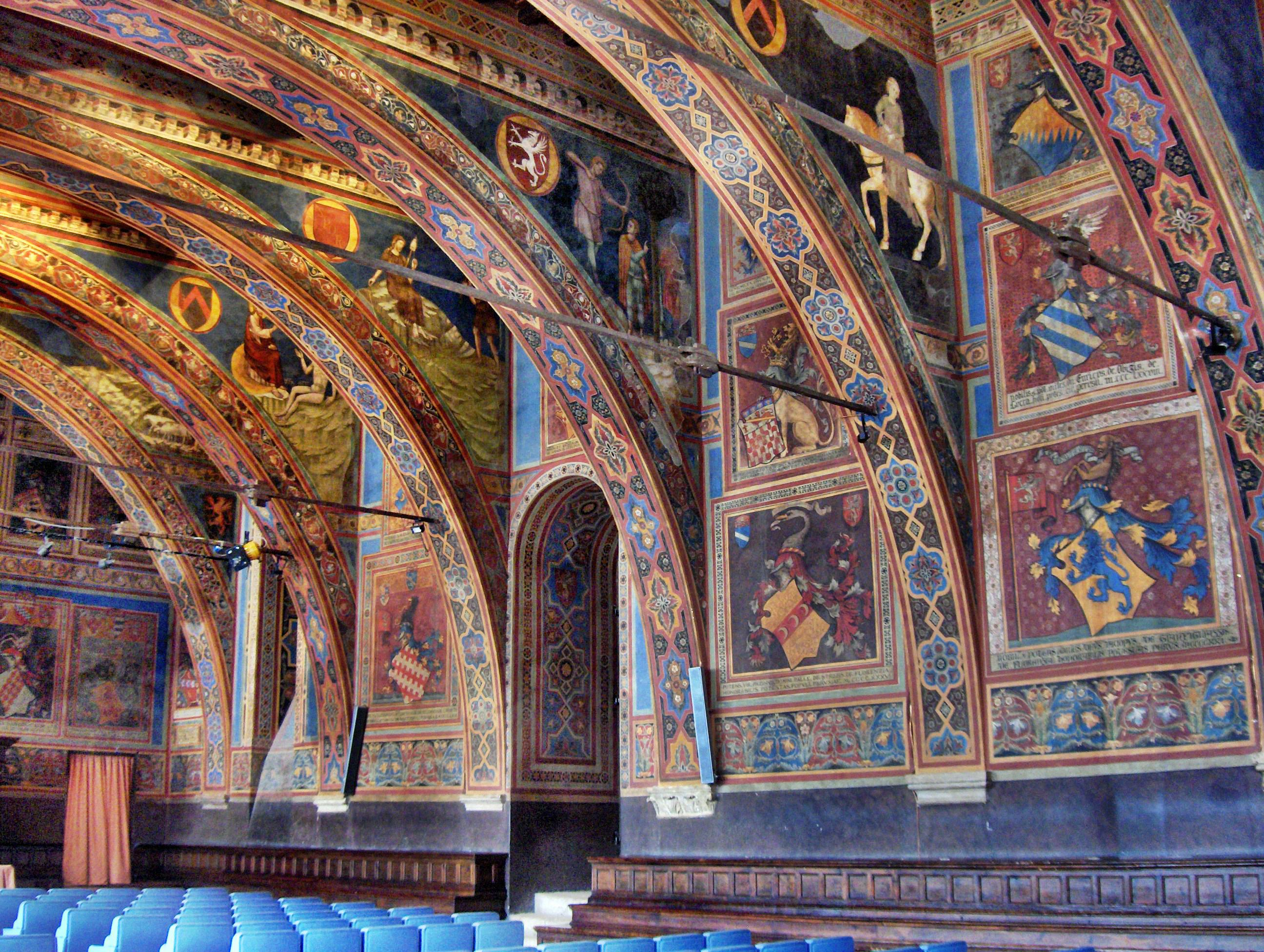
Sala dei Notari

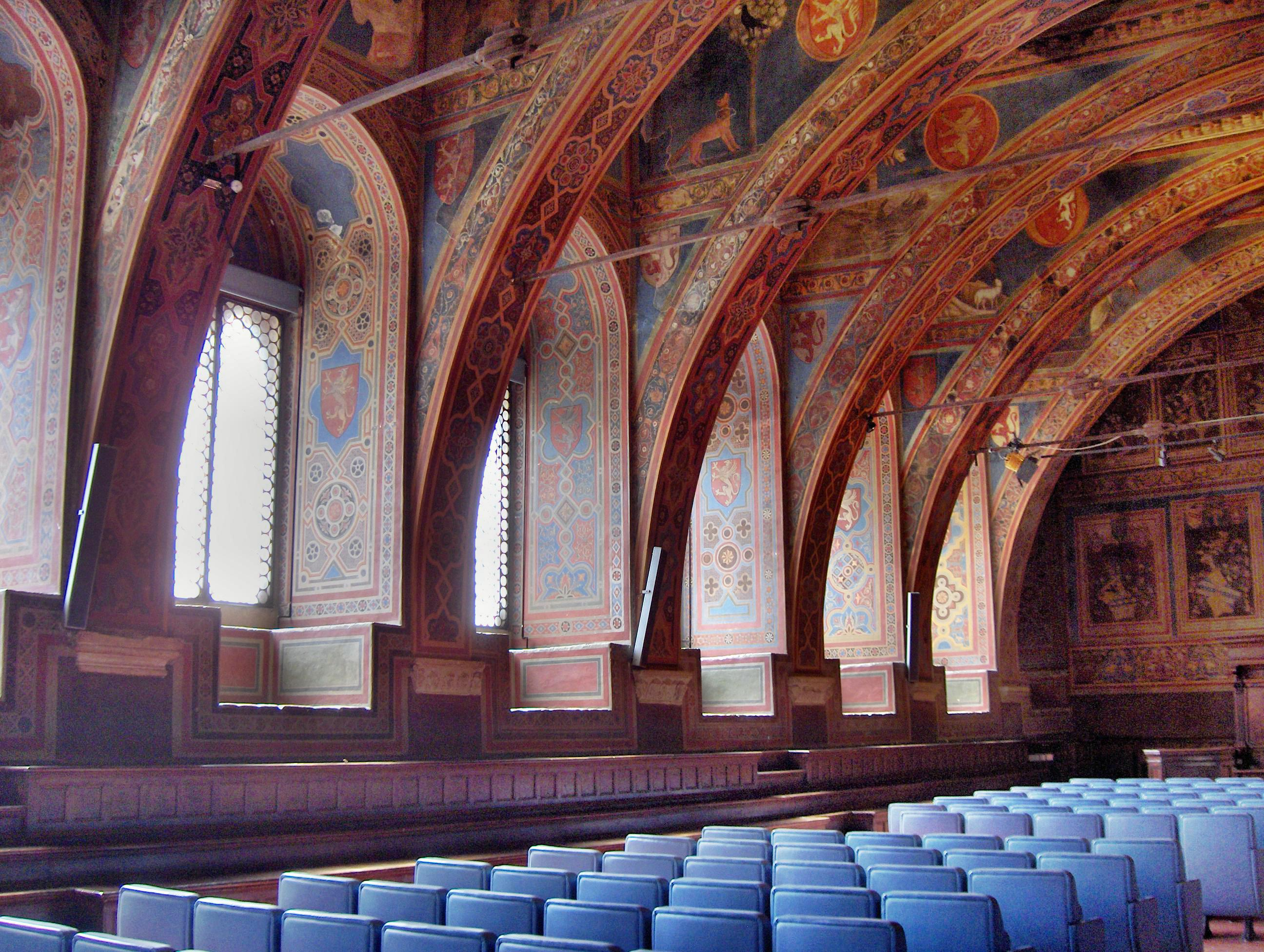
The 16th-century seats along the perimeter of the room

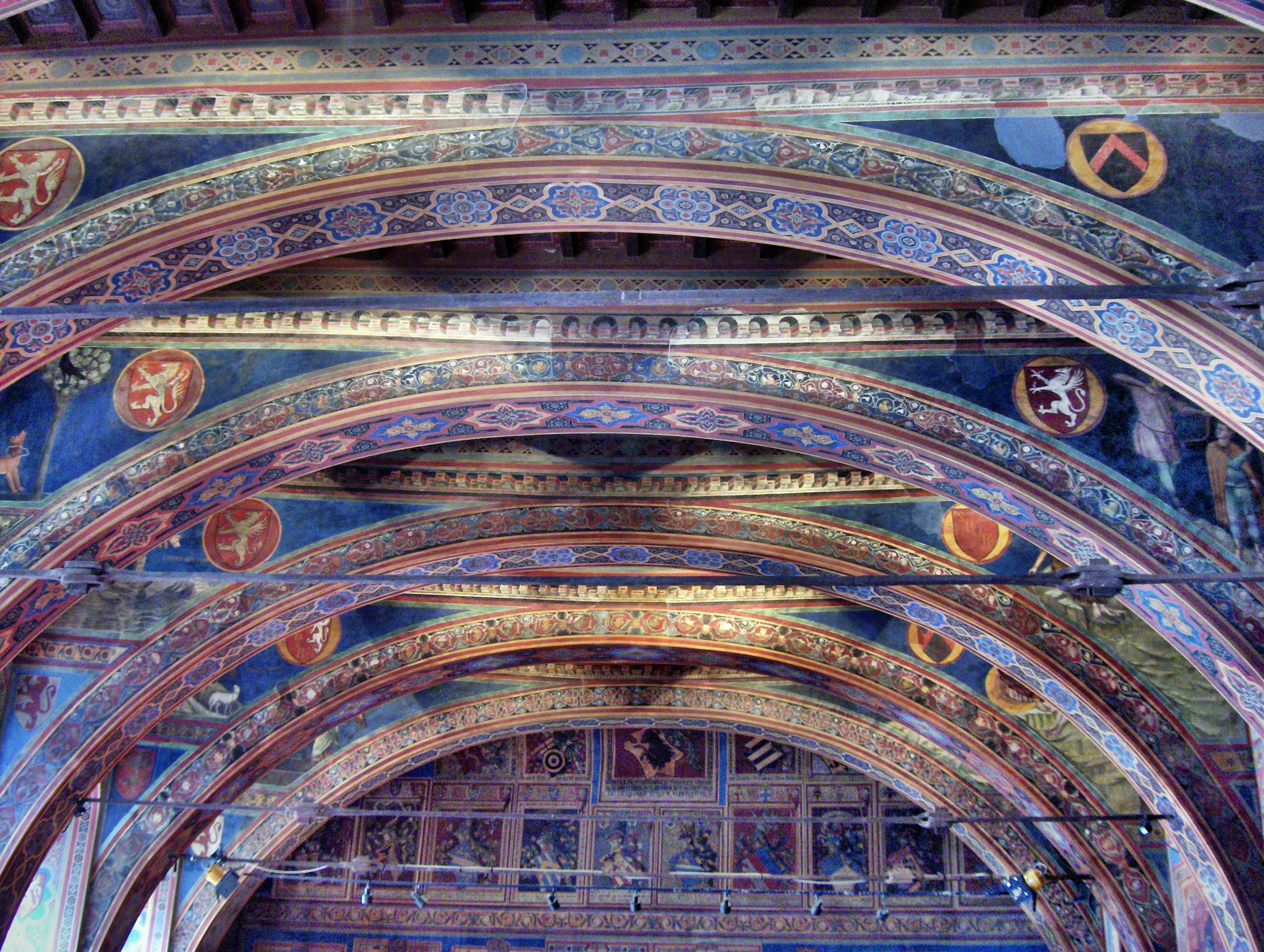
Detail

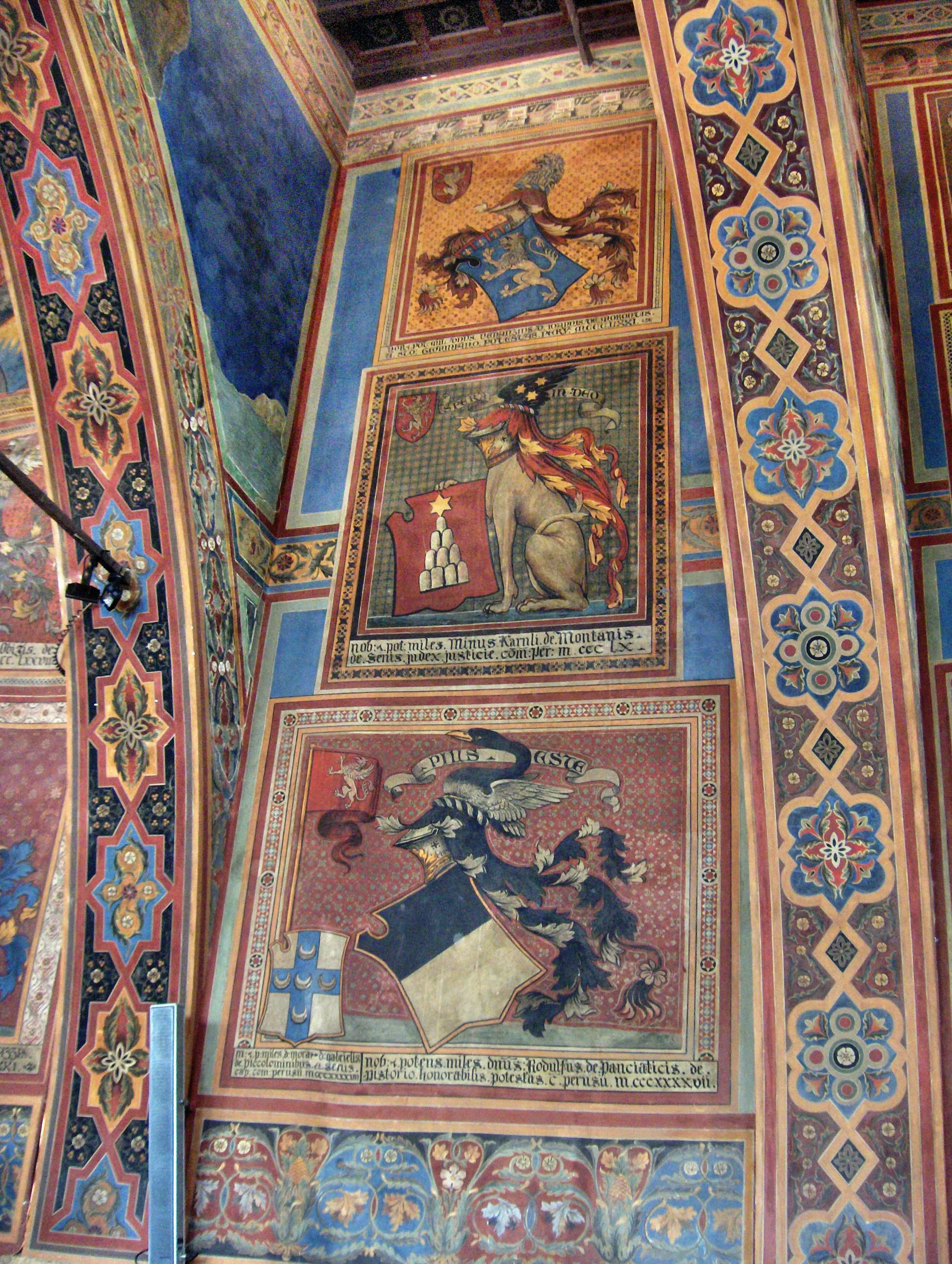
The medieval frescoes were painted by local artists

==== Vaccara Hall ====
Located on the north side of the building, it is accessible through the stairs on the right of the portal to the Sala dei Notari or from inside on the main floor. The room occupies the area of the former Church of Saint Severus. The small entrance door has shutters covered by an iron plate with carved griffins and in the centre the letters A.G., meaning Armadium Generale, i.e. the first municipal archives. At the top is an inscription dating from 1339 which reads: MCCCXXXVIIII Gilius Rufinelli me fecit ( 'MCCCXXXVIIII Gilius Rufinelli made me'). Before that date, the task of maintaining and archiving municipal documents belonged to the Dominican friars. The interior is a Gothic structure with a cross vault with ribs. On the left vault are frescoes representing Saint Christopher, the protector of commercial trade, and Saint Bartholomew the Apostle, the protector of craftsmen working with cutting tools. On the back wall is a fresco from a small country church depicting the Nativity and saints, made by Tiberio d'Assisi (15th-century Umbrian school). In 2010 a work by Perugian Mannerist Antonio Maria Abbatini (1598–1680), characterized by a large number of figures in a very small space, was placed there.

==== Council chamber ====
On the first floor is the Comune council chamber (Sala del Consiglio comunale), where above the door is a lunette with a fresco by Pinturicchio, depicting the Virgin Mary between two angels. Also preserved is the original Pietra della giustizia ('stone of justice'), dated 1234, which was publicly displayed in the main square (Piazza IV Novembre). In its place, under the Logge di braccio, next to the cathedral, a copy can be seen.

==== Priori Chapel ====
On the third floor, home to the Galleria Nazionale dell'Umbria, is the Priori Chapel, frescoed between 1454 and 1480 by the "official" artist Benedetto Bonfigli, with stories from the life of Louis of Toulouse, Franciscan saint belonging to the House of Anjou, an ally of Perugia, and Herculanus of Perugia, defined as the Defensor civitatis ('civic defender') and therefore patron saint of the city, who protected Perugia from the siege of Totila in 549. The paintings are of extraordinary importance for their description of the urban landscape, a testimony to the medieval city, painstakingly reproduced. The not yet scientific perspective highlights the fabulous and mythological aspect of the events.

Paolino di Giovanni of Ascoli created the choir stalls between 1452 and 1466. Ceramist Giacomo di Marino, known as il cavalla, made the glazed majolica floor between 1455 and 1457, decorated with Gothic-floral motifs on a blue background, alternating with flying angels anticipating a Renaissance style.

For this room the Decemviri, or the ten priori in charge of the city, commissioned from Pietro Perugino the Decemviri Altarpiece, an oil-on-panel painting (193 cm × 165 cm (76 in × 65 in)) datable to 1495–1496. In 1797 the painting, like hundreds of other paintings belonging to the church, was confiscated by Napoleon's troops through the Treaty of Tolentino, as an object of the Napoleonic looting of art. In 1815, it was regained by Antonio Canova, and intended for the Pinacoteca Vaticana in Rome. The decorative molding with the Cristo in pietà (87 cm × 90 cm (34 in × 35 in)) remained in Perugia and now is in the Galleria Nazionale dell'Umbria.

==== Collegio del Cambio Hall ====
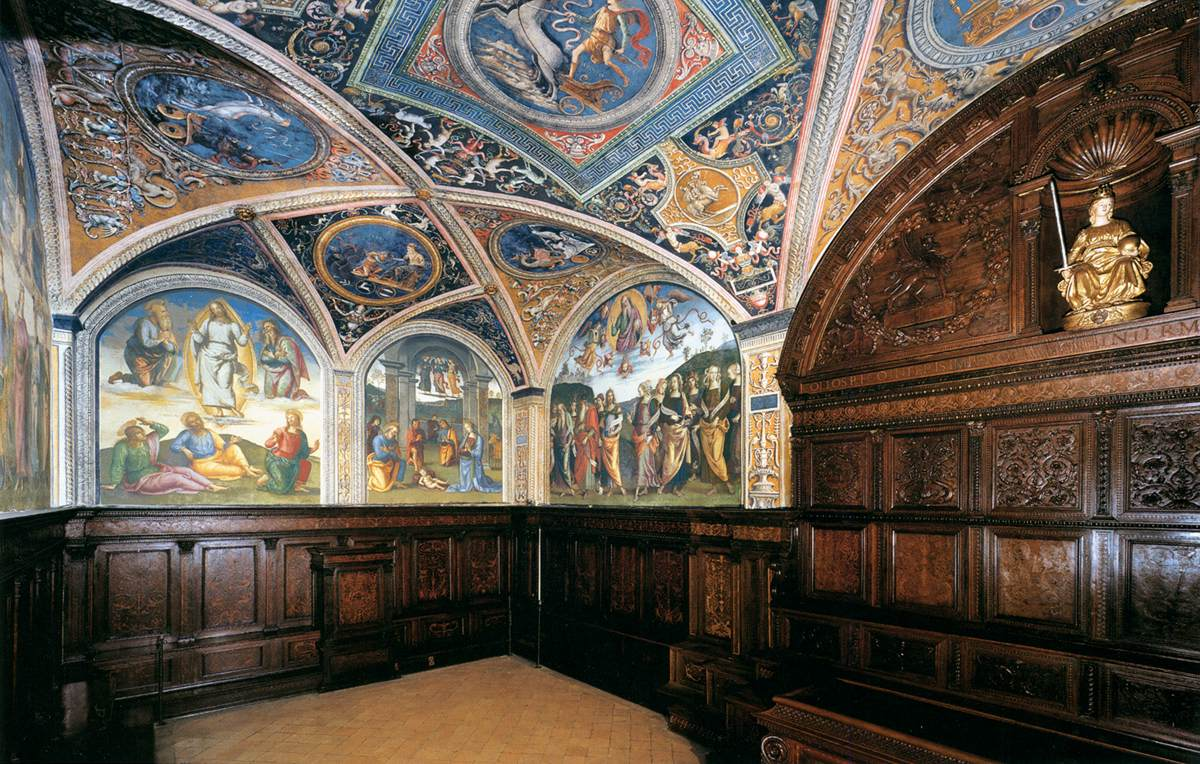
Sala dell'Udienza del Collegio del Cambio

Another important room with its own entrance on Corso Vannucci, is the Hearing Room of the Collegio del Cambio, frescoed between 1498 and 1500 by Perugino, with the help of his pupil Raffaello (by him are the Fortezza and the face of Solomon) and furnished with a great wood bench (Domenico del Tasso, 1492–1493) and seats along the walls (Antonio da Mercatello, 1508). The decoration is completed by a terracotta statue of uncertain attribution (perhaps by Benedetto da Maiano), depicting Justice.

The ceiling of the Collegio del Cambio Hall was defined by Edith Wharton in her The Decoration of Houses, as one of the three perfect ceilings of the world: "Of all forms of ceiling adornment painting is the most beautiful. Italy, which contains the three perfect ceilings of the world – those of Mantegna in the ducal palace of Mantua (see Plate XXV), of Perugino in the Sala del Cambio at Perugia and of Araldi in the Convent of St. Paul at Parma – is the best field for the study of this branch of art."

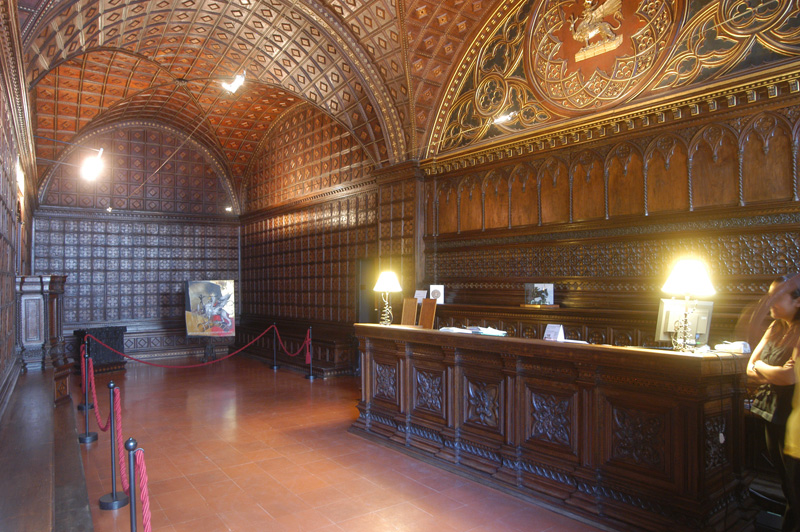
Sala del Collegio della Mercanzia

==== Collegio della Mercanzia Hall ====
The Collegio della mercanzia, located in the second fondaco to the right of the Portale Maggiore, is entirely covered in late Gothic wooden decoration.

== In popular culture ==
Netflix series Can This Love Be Translated? which follows the romance between interpreter Joo Ho-jin and actress Cha Mu-hee, was filmed in front of the main gate of the building and the adjacent plaza in early December 2024.

== Bibliography ==
- Touring Club Italiano – La Biblioteca di Repubblica (2004). L'Italia: Umbria (in Italian). Touring editore.
- Mancini, Franceso Federico (2000). Il Palazzo dei Priori di Perugia (in Italian). Perugia: Quatroemme. ISBN 9788885962354.
