= Pietà Gonfalon =

1472 painting by Pietro Perugino

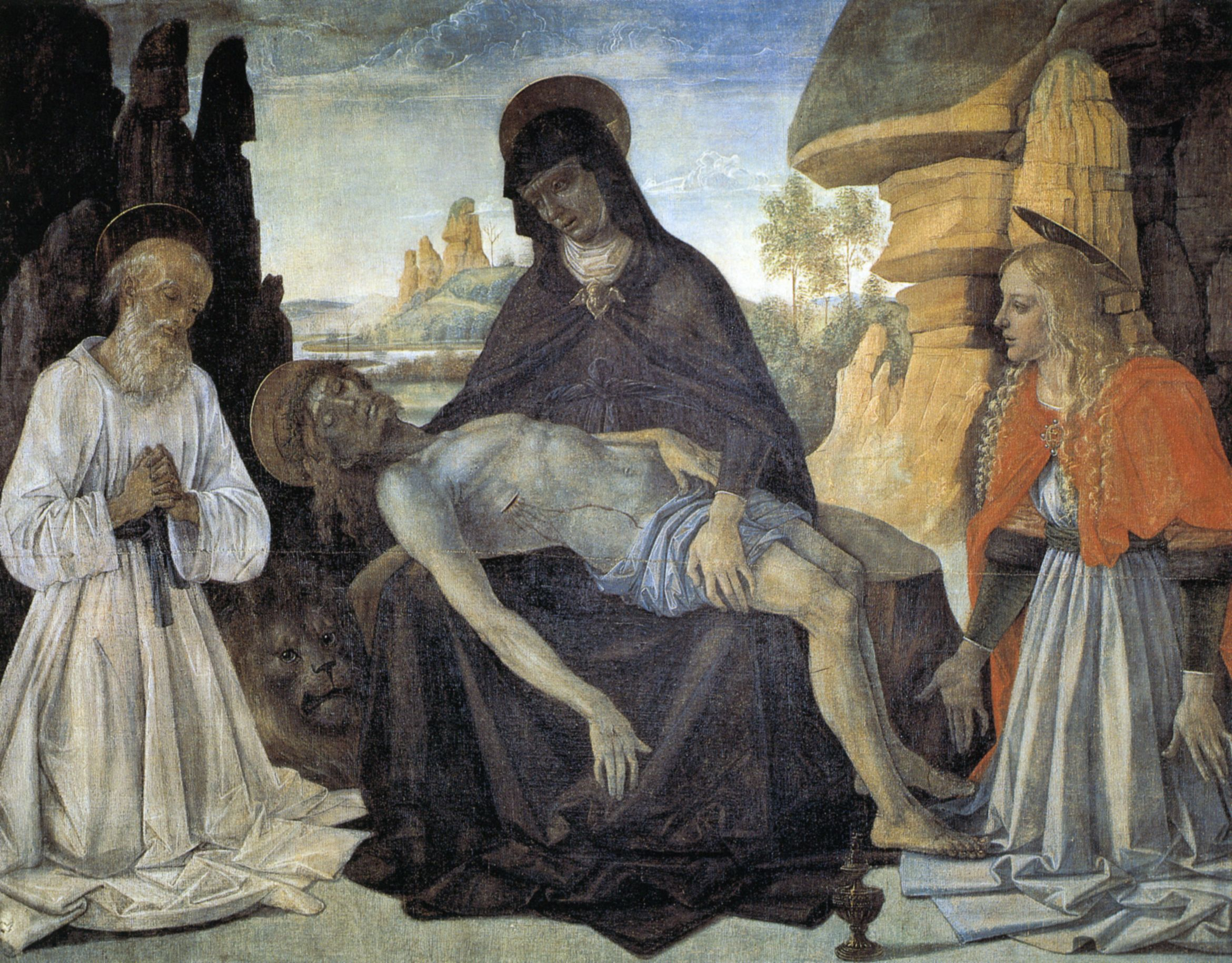
- Artist: Pietro Perugino
- Year: c. 1472
- Medium: tempera on canvas
- Dimensions: 128 cm × 165 cm (50 in × 65 in)
- Location: Galleria Nazionale dell'Umbria, Perugia

The Pietà Gonfalon (Italian - Gonfalone con la Pietà) is a c. 1472 tempera on canvas painting by Pietro Perugino, now in the Galleria Nazionale dell'Umbria in Perugia. It was produced as a gonfalon or processional banner for the Franciscan monastery at Farneto, near Perugia. It is an early work by the artist and shows the Pietà.
