= Saint Augustine (Pinturicchio) =

Painting by Pinturicchio

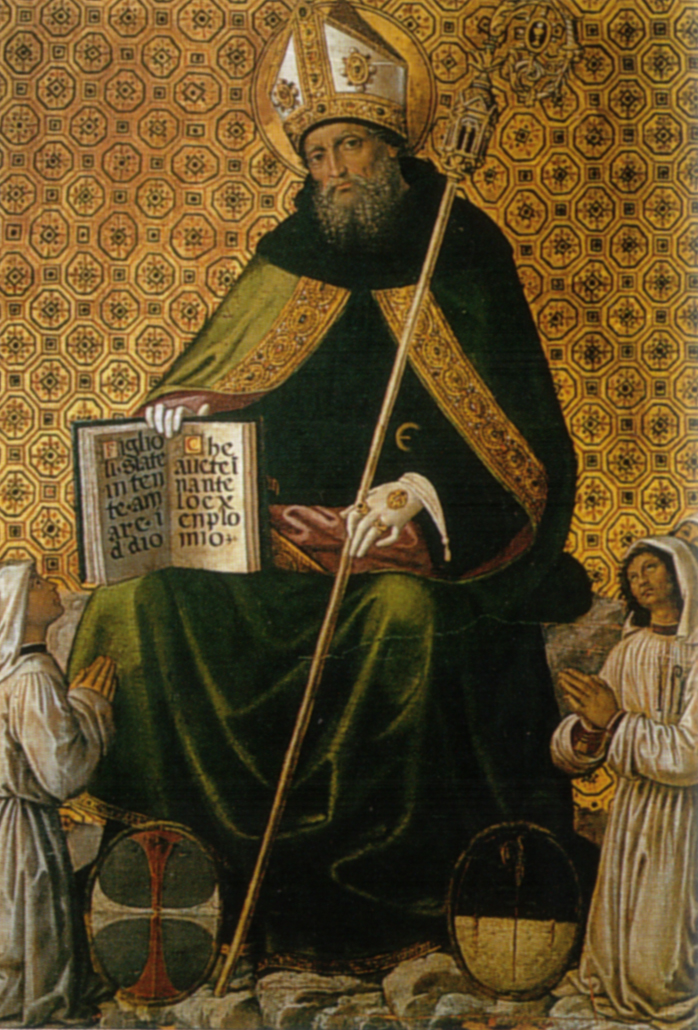
- Artist: Pinturicchio
- Medium: Oil on silk
- Dimensions: 115 cm × 83 cm (45 in × 33 in)
- Location: Galleria nazionale dell'Umbria, Perugia

Saint Augustine is a painting of 1510 in oils on silk by Pinturicchio, depicting Saint Augustine of Hippo. It was painted as a gonfalon or processional banner for the Sant'Agostino company of flagellants in Perugia. When that order was suppressed, the work was moved to the Galleria Nazionale dell'Umbria in the same city, where it remains.

The work is typical of the artist's style after his stay at the court of Pope Alexander VI in Rome, where he acquired a taste for Hispano-Moorish style and symbols, as seen on the furnishings imported by this Spanish pope. The motifs on the gold ground are typical of textile art and turn it into a trompe-l'œil wall hanging, whilst the saint is shown dressed in rich episcopal vestments with jewelled edges, mitre and rings. He holds a bishop's crook and an open book bearing an Italian translation of a quotation from his writings: "Figlioli siate intente amare iddio che avete inante lo exemplio mio" ('Little children, be intent on loving God as you have seen in my example'). He is flanked by two members of the company with emblems of the company.
