= Adoration of the Magi (Perugino, Perugia) =

Painting by Pietro Perugino

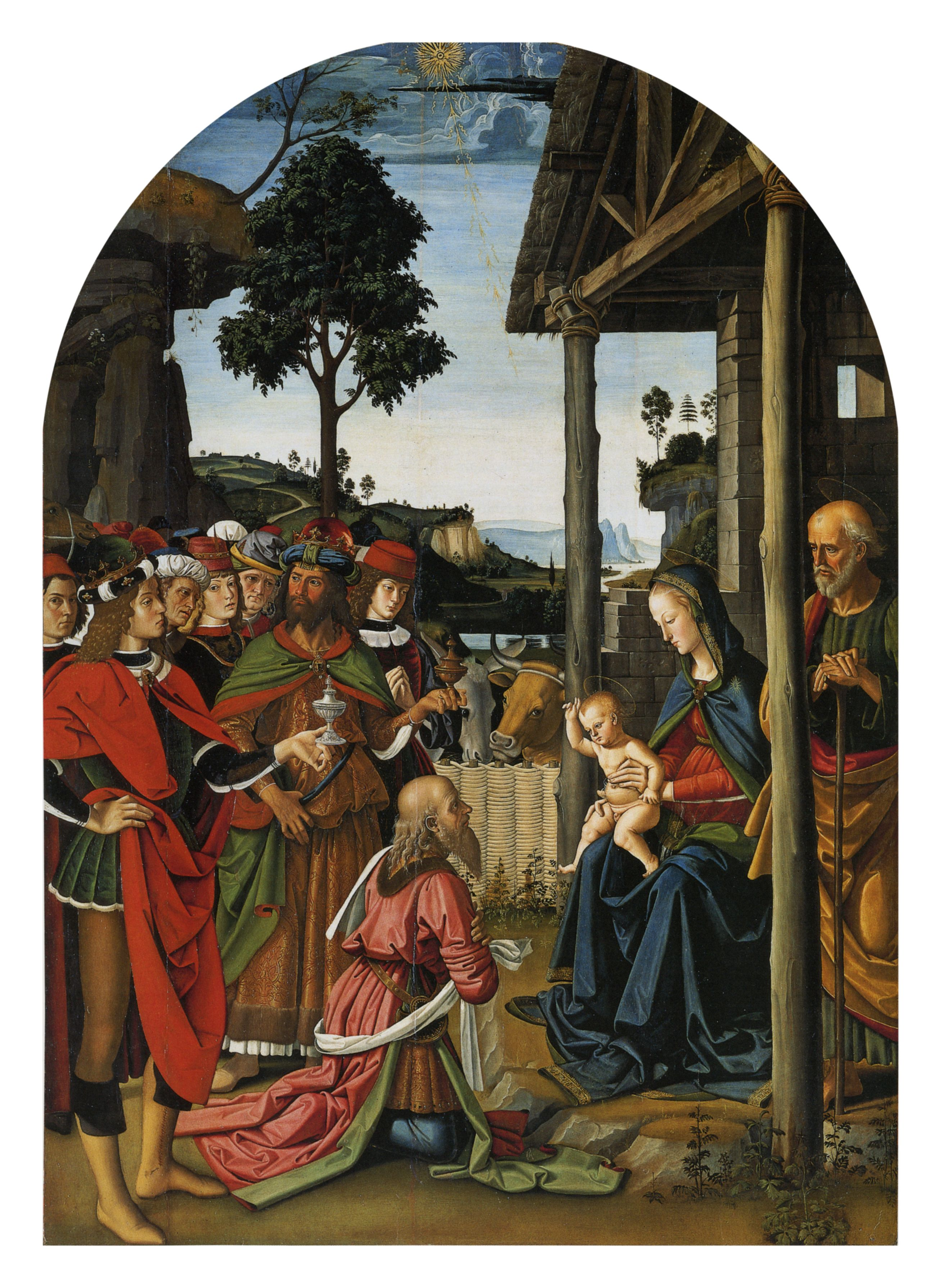
- Artist: Pietro Perugino
- Year: 1470–1473 or c. 1476
- Medium: tempera on wood
- Dimensions: 241 cm × 180 cm (95 in × 71 in)
- Location: Galleria Nazionale dell'Umbria, Perugia, Italy

The Adoration of the Magi is a painting by the Italian Renaissance painter Pietro Perugino, housed in the Galleria Nazionale dell'Umbria of Perugia, Italy.

According to Italian art historian Vittoria Garibaldi, it was one of the earliest commissions received by Perugino around the end of his apprenticeship in Florence (1472), while others date it to the late 1470s. The painting was originally executed for the church of Santa Maria dei Servi in Perugia, connected to the Baglioni family; in 1543 it was moved to the church of Santa Maria Nuova in the same city.

== Description ==
The scene follows a standard layout, with the nativity hut on the right and the visitors' procession, developing horizontally, on the left. On the background, behind the ox and the donkey, is a rocky, hilly landscape painted using aerial perspective.

The Virgin holds the blessing child on her knees, and behind her is St. Joseph, standing, with a stick. The oldest of the magi is already kneeled, while the other two are offering the gifts. The crowded procession includes figures which are common in Perugino's works, such as the boy with a turban and the blonde youngsters in elegant postures. The man on the extreme left is perhaps a self-portrait of Perugino.

== Style ==
The Virgin and Child are reminiscent of Perugino's Gambier Parry Madonna at the Courtauld Institute in London, dating to the very early 1470s. In general, the scene's style is related to Verrocchio's workshop, where Perugino made his apprenticeship. The characters, forming a crowd typical of late-Gothic art, show a robust appearance seen in the works of Fiorenzo di Lorenzo, perhaps the earliest master of Perugino. The integration between the characters and the landscape is inspired to Piero della Francesca, such as the golden ratio tree; the landscape is similar to works by Leonardo da Vinci.

== Sources ==
- Garibaldi, Vittoria (2004). "Perugino". Pittori del Rinascimento. Florence: Scala. ISBN 978-88-8117-099-9.
