= God the Father with Two Saints =

Fresco by Pietro Perugino

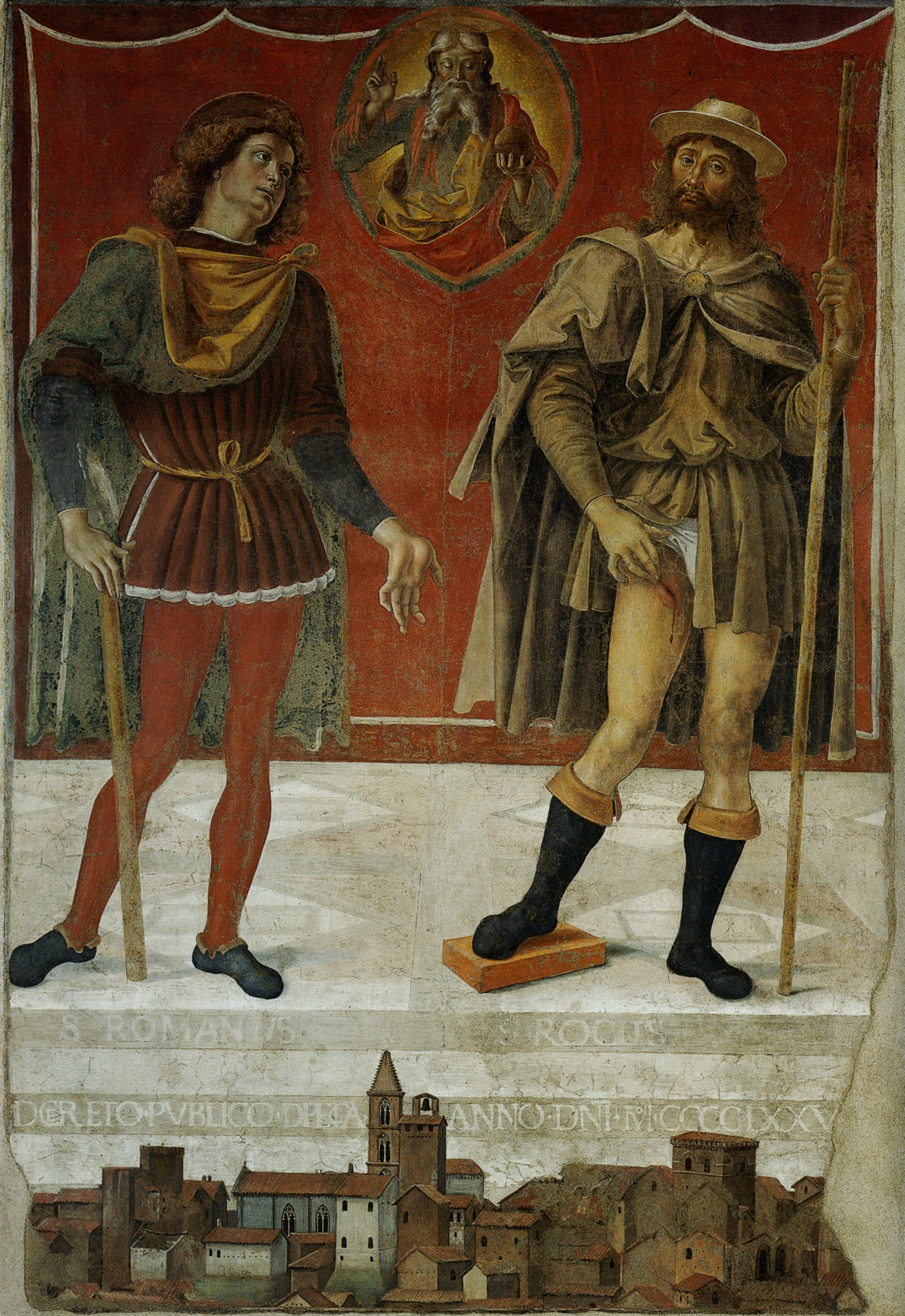
God the Father with Two Saints (1477–1478) by Perugino

God the Father with Two Saints is a 1477–78 fresco by Perugino. It was painted for the church of San Francesco in Deruta and shows the town at its base, along with the inscription "DECRETO PUBBLICO DFCTA / ANNO D[OMI]NI MCCCCLXXV[II/III]". This shows it was an ex voto for the end of the plague in 1476 - the two saints are St Roch (right) and St Romanus (left), both invoked against the plague.

It comes from the painter's initial period back in Umbria after returning following his training under Andrea del Verrocchio in Florence. It reuses elements from his previous work - St Roch's head is similar to that of Balthazar in Adoration of the Magi, whilst the pavement pattern is from The Miracle of the Stillborn Child.

== Bibliography ==
- Vittoria Garibaldi, Perugino, in Pittori del Rinascimento, Scala, Florence, 2004 (ISBN 888117099X)
