= Collegio del Cambio =

Coordinates: 43°06′40″N 12°23′18″E

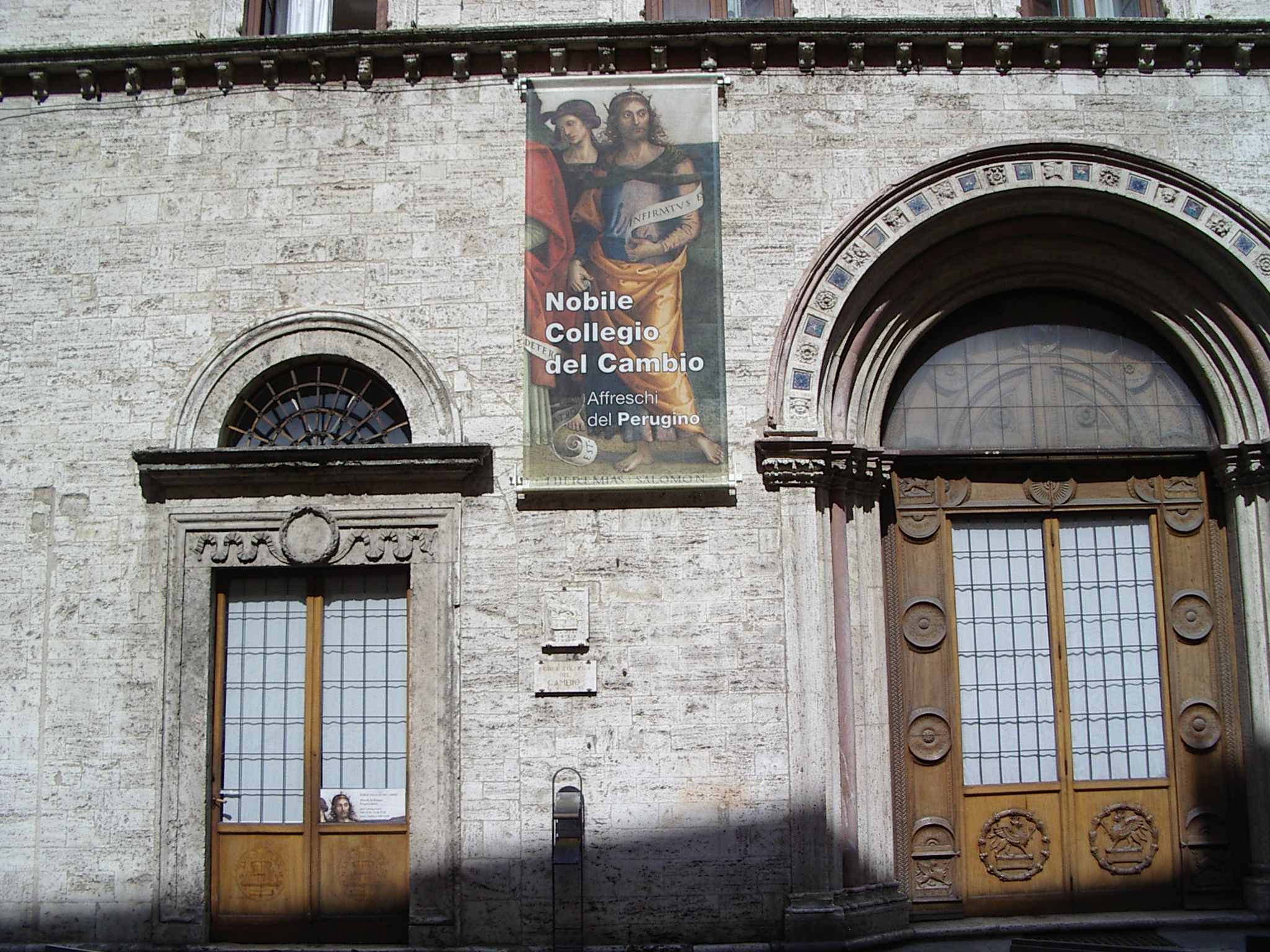
Collegio del Cambio

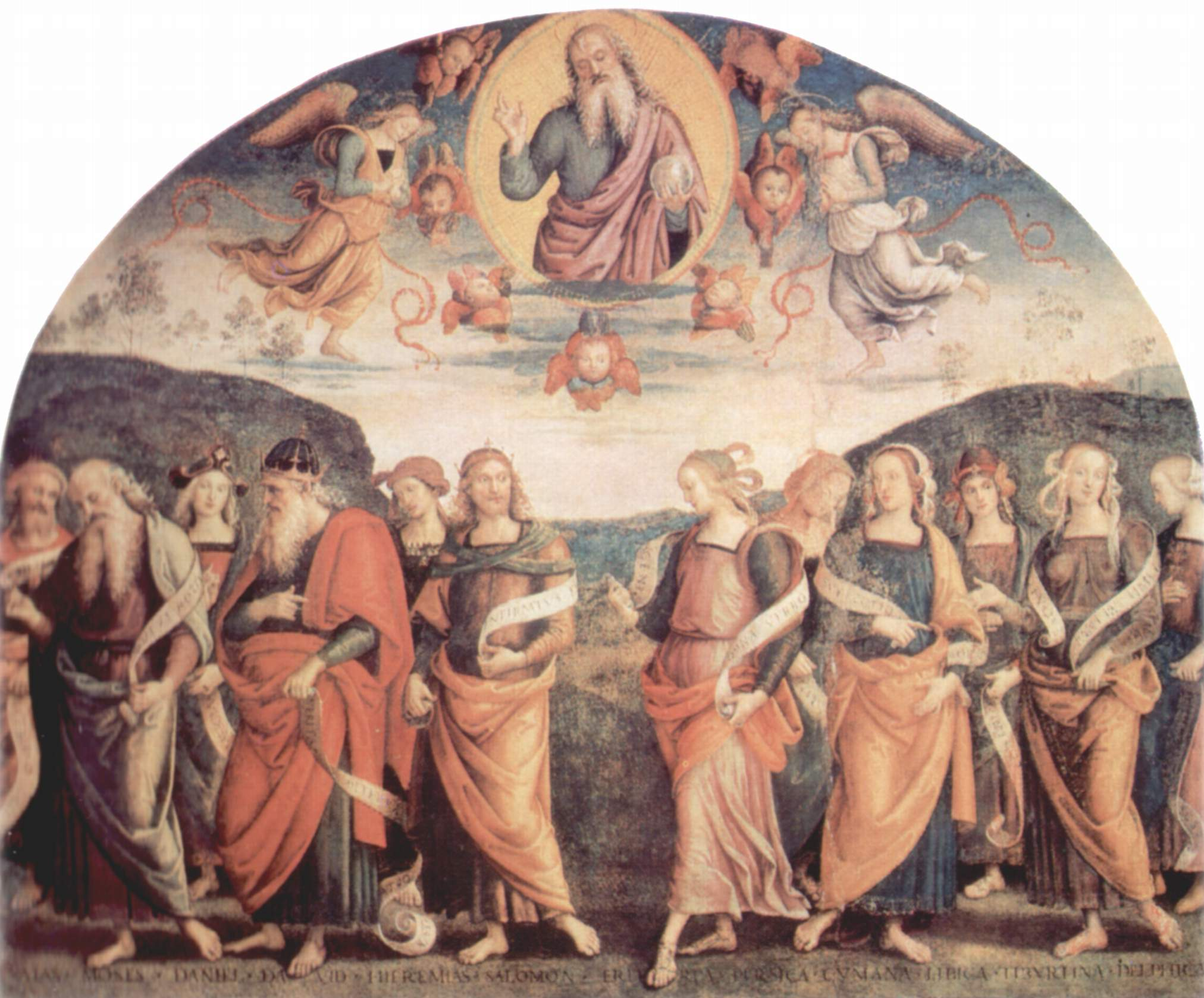
Pietro Perugino fresco at the Collegio del Cambio, 1497-1500

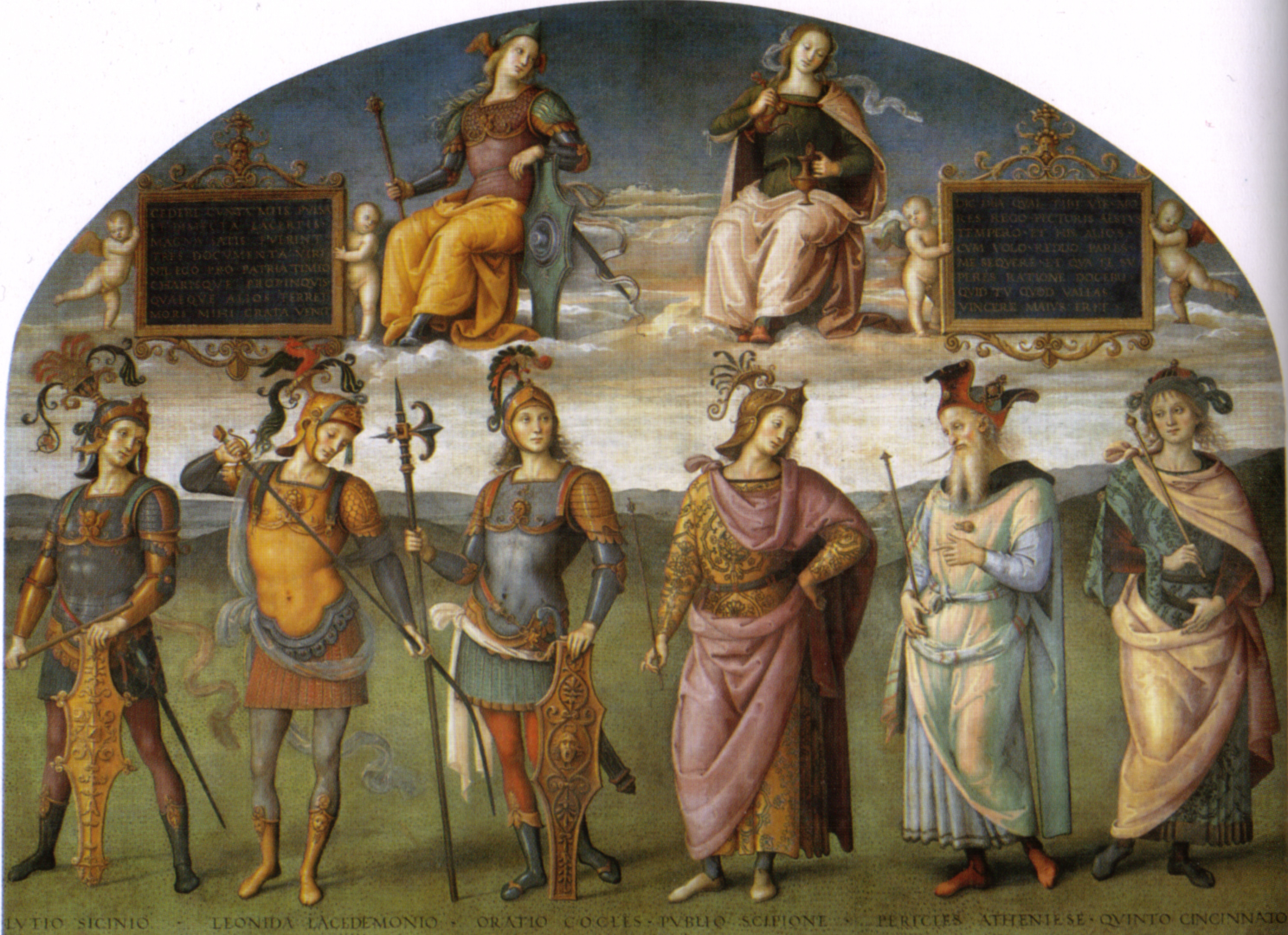
Perugino fresco depicting Famous men of Antiquity. Represented from left to right are Lucius Siccius Dentatus, Leonidas, Horatius Cocles, Publius Scipio, Pericles, and Lucius Quinctius Cincinnatus. Above are allegories of Fortitude and Temperance.

The Collegio del Cambio is the historic seat of the exchange guild in the Palazzo dei Priori in the city of Perugia, Italy. It was built between 1452 and 1457 and now houses a number of artistic masterpieces.

== Sources ==
- NY Times
