= Benedetto Bonfigli =

Italian painter

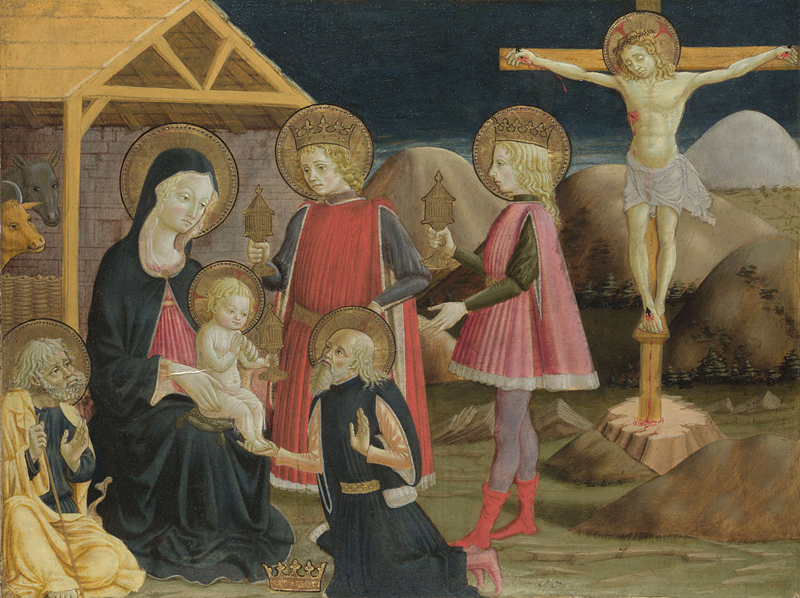
The Adoration of the Kings, and Christ on the Cross, Benedetto Bonfigli, National Gallery, London

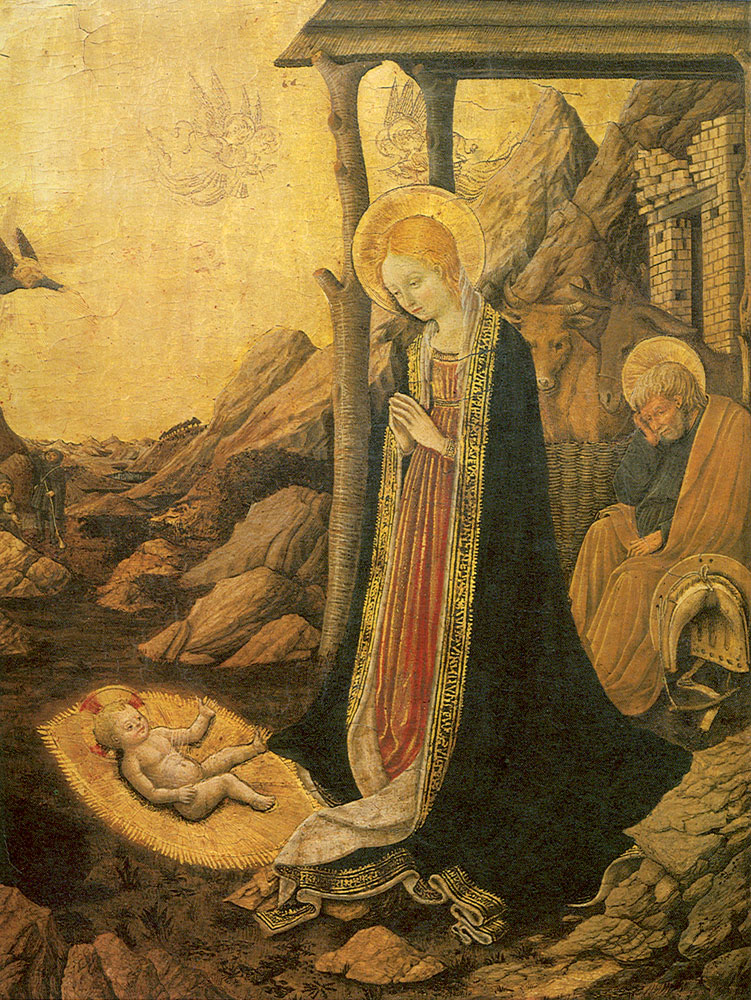
Adoration of the Child, Benedetto Bonfigli, Berenson foundation Settignano, Florence

Benedetto Bonfigli (c. 1420 – 8 July 1496) was an Italian Renaissance painter born in Perugia, and part of the Umbria school of painters including Raphael and Perugino. He is also known as Buonfiglio. Influenced by the style of Domenico Veneziano, Benozzo Gozzoli, and Fra Angelico, Bonfigli primarily painted frescos for the church and was at one point employed in the Vatican. His best-preserved work is the Annunciation, but his masterpiece is the decoration of the chapel of the Palazzo dei Priori. Bonfigli specialized in gonfaloni, a Perugian style using banners painted on canvas or linen. Little is known of his personal life, but he was an esteemed painter in Perugia before Perugino, who is said to be his pupil.

== Style ==
Bonfigli as a painter was heavily influenced by Fra Angelico. His attention to detail in smaller areas of his paintings, as well as his use of gold to highlight both sacred and earthly elements, can be attributed to Fra Angelico. Bonfigli frequently used backdrops of forestry and cityscapes to provide an additional sense of depth to his pieces. His backgrounds are often said to have been influenced by Domenico Veneziano, who used rolling hills and trees as backdrops to make his paintings more realistic. These stylistic influences of Angelico and Veneziano's are particularly pertinent in Bonfigli's Annunciation and Adoration of the Child. Most of Bonfigli's frescos use softer colours in the fabrics on his figures, but typically highlights the Virgin Mary in blue, an expensive dye attributed with royalty and sanctity, with a gold halo. He often incorporates historical architecture from his home town Perugia in his works, sometimes meshing buildings of different eras. Bonfigli's method is also similar to his teacher, Benozzo Gozzoli, who had been Fra Angelico's assistant and had worked in Umbria from 1450 to 1456, in that he uses softer colours on the garments of his figures that brings additional depth to his paintings.

== Early life and first works ==
Bonfigli trained in Perugia from 1430 to 1440, while the late-Gothic style was still dominant. Bonfigli's earliest surviving work is a dismembered polyptych, depicting Virgin and Child on the central panel, St Sebastian and a Bishop Saint on another wing, and what is believed to be St Bernardino of Siena and St Anthony Abbot on another.

The painter's first commissioned work is attributed to the Virgin and Child with Two Angels for a chapel near S. Pietro, Perugia on 7 March 1445. He was influenced by the works of Fra Angelico, particularly during his employment in the Vatican by Pope Nicholas V in 1450, where many of Angelico's frescoes were displayed in the Cappella Niccolina of the Palazzo Vaticano, the pope's private chapel.

We know Bonifgli was held in high regard by the pope due to his high salary at the time (seven ducats a month). Other works, such as Fra Angelico's Cortona Polyptych commissioned in 1437, and the works of Domenico Veneziano in Perugia also heavily influenced Bonfigli's style. A close interpretation of Bonfigli's style is evident in a fresco dated 1446 of SS Catherine and Clement I in S. Cristoforo, Passigano; this piece, likely not the work of Bonfigli, demonstrates the influence the painter had on the region.

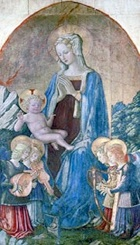
Madonna and Child with Angels (ca. 1450), Altarpiece, Benedetto Bonfigli, Galleria Nazionale dell'Umbria

== Maturity ==
Bonfigli reached maturity as an artist after returning to Perugia from Rome between 1453 and 1470. During this period, he painted the Annunciation, a smaller piece but among his most well-known and preserved, held in the Thyssen-Bornemisza Museum in Madrid. Bonfigli was influenced by the style of Gozzoli, a Florentine Renaissance painter; his stylistic method is evident in Bonfigli's Annunciation with St. Luke and Virgin and the Four Saints, both held in the Galleria Nazionale dell'Umbria in Perugia, Italy. According to Giorgio Vasari, the Perugian artist painted the Adoration of the Magi coupled with a predella of Episodes from the Life of Christ and a Miracle of St Nicholas in 1466 for the chapel of San Vincenzo in San Domenico, collaborating with Bartolomeo Caporali.

One of his masterpieces is a series of frescoes in the chapel of the Palazzo dei Priori in Perugia, which represent the Lives of St Louis of Toulouse and St Herculanus; the frescoes were commenced in 1454 and not finished in 1496, in which year Bonfigli's will is dated. One gonfalone, or banner, was painted in 1465 for the brotherhood of San Bernardino, and represented the deeds of their patron saint. Another gonfalone was painted for the brotherhood of San Fiorenzo in 1476. He painted the Virgin of Mercy (1478) for the church of the Commenda di Santa Croce. All of these works comprised a collection of gonfaloni across Perugia.

=== The Palazzo dei Priori ===
Chaplain Bartolomeo da Siena commissioned Bonfigli in 1454 to decorate half of the Priori Chapel. The chaplain intended to have the chapel painted with the Crucifixion with the Virgin and SS John the Evangelist, Laurence and Herculanus on the altar wall; and four scenes from the life of St Louis of Toulouse. The commission was altered later, and the fresco of the Crucifixion on the altar wall was not painted. The other four scenes of St Louis of Toulouse were arranged counter-clockwise from the right of the altar wall. One scene shows St Louis professing the Franciscan Rule before Pope Boniface VIII; another shows St Louis posthumously reuniting a merchant, with the church of San Domenico in Perugia clearly visible in the background; the third, badly damaged, depicts a miracle performed by St Louis; and the fourth shows St Louis's burial in a church resembling the church of St Pietro in Perugia. This half of the Priori chapel was finished in 1461, and the artist Filippo Lippi adjudicated the work and priced it at 400 Florentine florins. The works are now held in the Galleria Nazionale dell'Umbria.

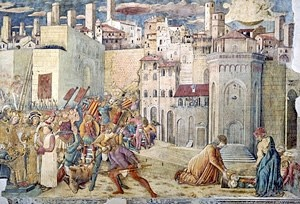
Totila's Siege of Perugia, Benedetto Bonfigli, Galleria Nazionale dell'Umbria

==== Totila's siege of Perugia ====
The second half of the chapel was also commissioned to Bonfigli to decorate. The frescoes in the second half depict the scenes from the life of St Herculanus. The original commission was for four frescoes, but Bonfigli only painted three. The right of the back wall was painted with the fresco Totila's siege of Perugia. This wildly active fresco is divided into two scenes, with the siege of Totila depicted on the left and the scene after the city has fallen on the right. The left side shows Totila's army camped out around the ruins of the amphitheatre outside Porta Marzia which effected the siege when it began in 542. The left scene takes place in 549, where the soldiers gather around an ox. This ox was thrown over the city walls by St. Herculanus to convince the army the city still had provisions, but the trick was ruined by a cleric who revealed the lie. The right side of the fresco shows a few citizens of Perugia laying a beheaded St Herculanus and a young boy into a grave after the city had fallen. The city in the background provides a depiction of the Colle Landone, a hill in Perugia occupied by the Etruscans in the 4th century B.C., before the building of the Roman wall Rocca Paolina in 1540. The fresco shows historical buildings of Perugia, including the Porta Marzia, the church of Sant' Ercolano, and the towers of Baglioni palaces.

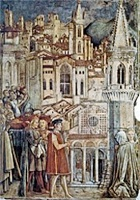
Translation to San Pietro, Benedetto Bonfigli, Galleria Nazionale dell'Umbria

==== Translation to San Pietro ====
Left of the altar wall in the Priori Chapel is the fresco Translation to San Pietro. The scene takes place after the fall of Perugia to Totila and the martyrdom of Herculanus. A procession carries the uncorrupt body of Herculanus, having passed Sant’ Ercolano and San Domenico and about to enter San Pietro. Herculanus is carried on a bier, and a small boy behind him to the left represents the boy who had been buried with him and brought back to life.

==== Translation to the Duomo ====
The whole of the left wall of the Chapel was covered with a scene that has been badly damaged. The frescos depict the translation of the relics of St. Herculanus in 936 from San Pietro to the Duomo. The surviving fragments show three different scenes; a group of Dominicans entering the Duomo, the Palazzo dei Priori with city magistrates passing along the side; and a group of women passing alongside the San Domenico Vecchio. These scenes are logically the last scenes of the story of St Herculanus, but Bonfigli placed them in clockwise sequence between the Translation to San Pietro and Totila's siege of Perugia, likely because of the expanse of the left wall.

The commission was supposed to be completed in two years, but the work took far longer because of a delay of payment by the Commune for the first commission. The contract was renegotiated in 1469 with a debt owed by one Bartolomeo di Gregorio to Bonfigli. The frescoes were not completed by Bonfigli's death in 1496, but the painter dedicated the outstanding debt to complete the rest of the chapel frescoes.

=== The Annunciation ===
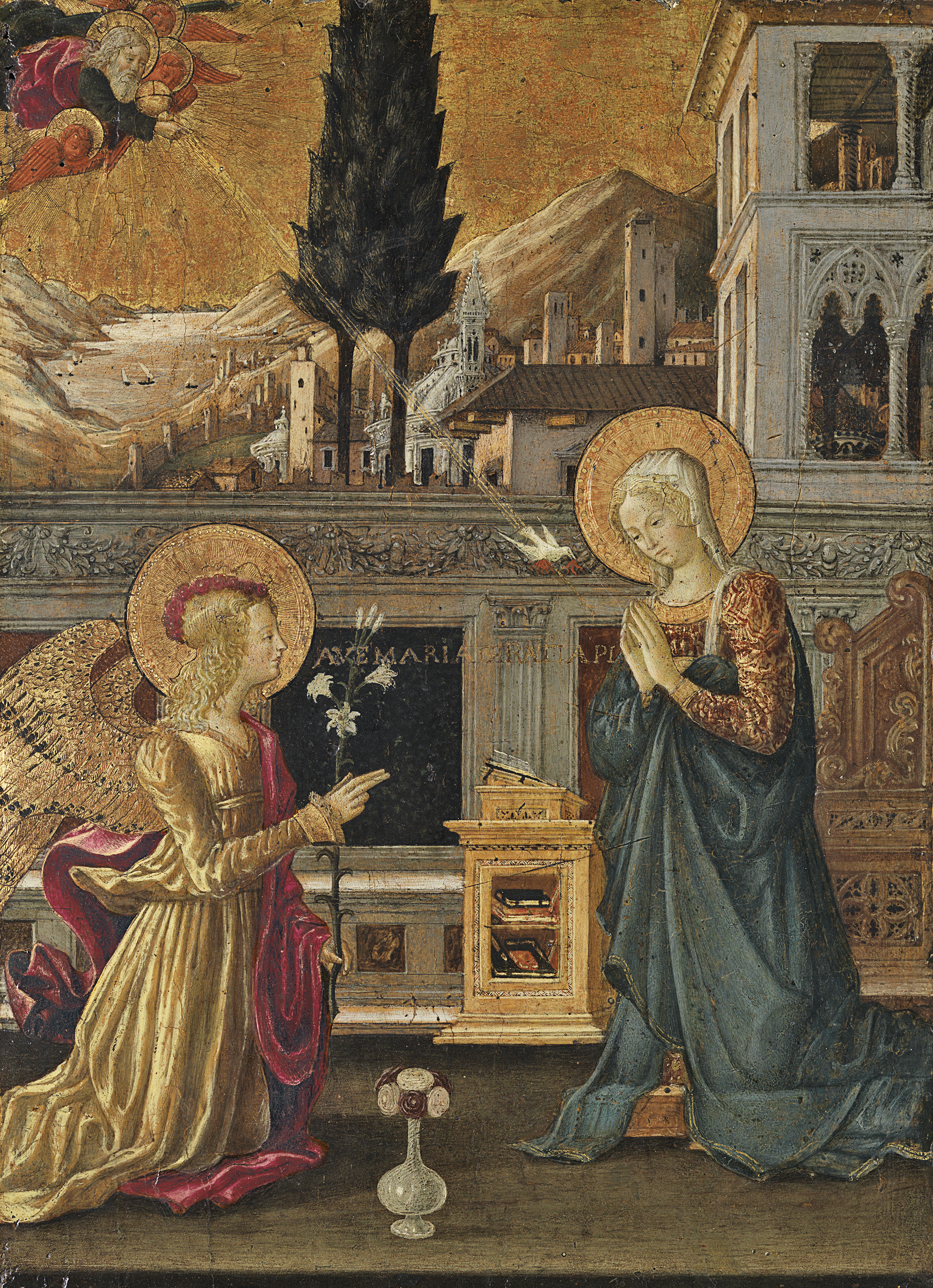
Annunciation, Benedetto Bonfigli, Museo Thyssen-Bornemisza, Madrid

One of Bonfigli's best-preserved works, the Annunciation depicts Mother Mary receiving two small flames into her heart from the Dove of the Holy Spirit, sent down by God surrounded by cherubs. The work is believed to have been executed between 1440 and 1445. The Virgin Mary appears to pray on the right next to the Archangel Gabriel with gold wings on the left. Gabriel is kneeling with a lily in his left hand, and his right hand raised in blessing while he pronounces the phrase on the marble-panelled parapet, "AVE MARIA GRATIA PLENA," or "Hail Mary full of grace."

Within the open terrace enclosed by the decorated parapet is Mary's lectern and wooden chair in the middle distance. An open prayer book rests on the lectern, which has an open cupboard containing various books. The background depicts a walled city on the shores of a lake, active with merchant vessels.

Bonfigli demonstrates his style by combining gold elements with gothic features, contrasting the divine halos and wings with the Gothic windows of the double loggia, presumed to be the Virgin's house, on the right. Bonfigli uses gold not only to accentuate the divine elements in the piece, but also in the greater, more earthly areas of the sky and textiles worn by Mary and the angel. This use of gold is often attributed to an earlier Gothic style, but does not detract from the sense of depth or reality in the scene. Bonfigli contrasts the Gothic details of the piece with classical ones, including the low wall separating the foreground and background which appears to be more modern in material and design.

The landscape in the Annunciation is also attributed to the influence of Domenico Veneziano, another Renaissance painter who worked in Perugia from 1438 to 1454. This piece is often compared with Veneziano's earliest dated work, Adoration of the Magi, held in the Gemäldegalerie in Berlin, where Bonfigli derived the sense of depth created by the pine trees in the middle of the painting. Fra Angelico's influence can also be noticed in the fine details of the work in the immediate foreground, such as the glass vase filled with roses.

The Annunciation belonged to the collection of Thomas Pelham Hood in Ulster during the 19th century, and was passed to another private collection in Rome before being sold on the Italian art market. In 1977, the first year the piece was on the market, it was purchased by Baron Hans Heinrich Thyssen-Bornemisza. The painting has suffered wear; the colours are rubbed and the modelling in the faces has suffered damage, and vertical cracks exist in the painted surface. The draperies and other colour losses have since been retouched.

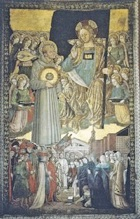
Gonfalon of San Bernardino (ca. 1465), Benedetto Bonfigli, Galleria Nazionale dell'Umbria

== Legacy ==
Benedetto Bonfigli is notable in that he is one of the Renaissance's earliest notable painters native to Perugia, granting the city artistic credibility before Raphael began his works. Bonfigli did not rank as high as other Renaissance artists of his time, including Niccolo da Foligno, his fellow pupil under Gozzoli. As Bernhard Berenson writes in his book, "far was it from [Bonfigli] to harbour a feeling... for what in painting is more essential than charming faces and pretty colour". Berenson describes the painter as "a much more dependent person", and more "imitative". Others argue that much of Bonfigli's work was critical in the birth of the Umbria school of art, that had lagged behind Florence and Northern Italy until the mid 15th century, but quickly rose as a first rank with Perugino, his student, and then Raphael.

== Major works ==
- Adoration of the Child (1450; Florence, I Tatti)
- Adoration of the Kings, and Christ on the Cross (1465–75; London, N.G.)
- Altarpiece Adoration of the Magi with the predella of Episodes from the Life of Christ and a Miracle of St Nicholas (Perugia, G.N. Umbria)

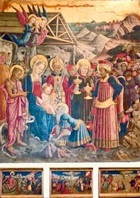
Adoration of the Magi (ca. 1466), Benedetto Bonfigli, Galleria Nazionale dell'Umbria

- Annunciation (Madrid, Mus. Thyssen-Bornemisza)
- Annunciation with St Luke (Perugia, G.N. Umbria)
- Christ Hurling Thunderbolts on Perugia with the Virgin and Saints Interceding (1472; Perugia, S Maria Nuova)
- Crucifixion with SS Francis and Herculanus (restored 1565; Perugia, G.N. Umbria)
- Gonfalon of San Bernardino (1465; Perugia, G.N. Umbria)
- Lives of St. Louis of Toulouse and St. Herculanus (1454- 61; Perugia, G.N. Umbria)
- Madonna of Misericordia (Perugia, S Francesco al Prato)
- Miracles of St Bernard (1473; Perugia, G.N. Umbria)
- Sant Ercolano and San Ludovico (1454; Palazzo del Consiglio)
- St Bernard Interceding for the Citizens of Perugia (1465; Perugia, G.N. Umbria)
- Totila's siege of Perugia (Late 15th century; Perugia, G.N. Umbria)
- Virgin and Child with Two Angels (El Paso, TX, Mus. A.)
- Virgin and Four Saints (Perugia, G.N. Umbria)
- Virgin and Saints Interceding for Perugia (1476; Perugia, S Fiorenzo)
