= Constantius of Perugia =

Patron saint of Perugia, Italy

Saint Constantius of Perugia
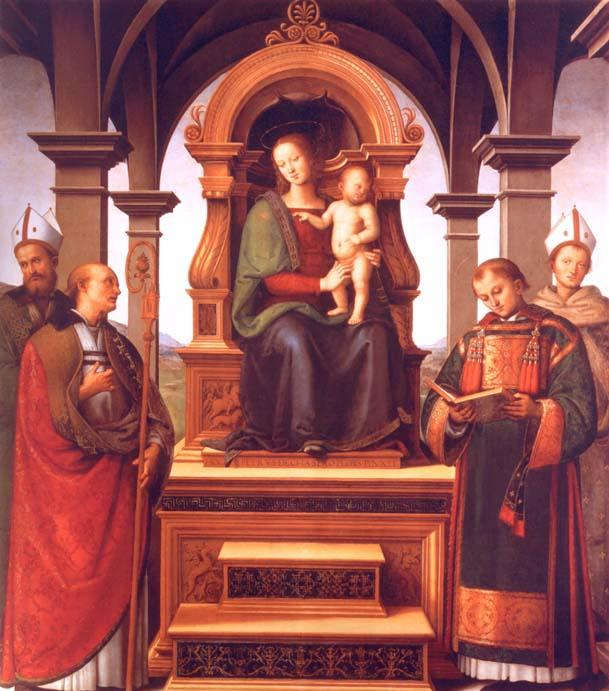
- Virgin Mary and Child, with Saints Louis of Toulouse, Lawrence, Herculanus of Perugia, and Constantius of Perugia. Pietro Perugino, 1497.
- Died: c. 170 AD
- Venerated in: Roman Catholic Church, Orthodox Church
- Feast: 29 January
- Attributes: episcopal attire
- Patronage: Perugia

Constantius of Perugia (also known as Costantius, Constance or Costanzo) (died c. 170 AD) is one of the patron saints of Perugia, Italy.

== Legend ==
According to his legend, of which four versions exist, he was arrested during the persecutions of Antoninus (some sources say Marcus Aurelius) and whipped, and then forced into a stove along with his companions, from which all escaped unharmed. He was jailed and set free by his guards, whom he had converted to Christianity. He sought refuge in a house owned by a Christian named Anastasius. But he, along with Anastasius, were arrested again and after being tortured in prisons at Assisi and Spello, were decapitated near Foligno.

Local tradition makes him the first bishop of Perugia. This tradition states that he became the first bishop of the city at the age of 30. He was active in evangelism and care for the poor.

== Veneration ==
His cult was diffused beyond Umbria. He was listed in the Martyrologium Hieronymianum under the feast day of January 29.

The four variations of his legend are consistent in regards to the place of his martyrdom (Foligno). A church in Perugia dedicated to him was demolished in 1527. The accounts of his martyrdom state that his body was carried to Perugia and buried near the site of the present-day cathedral there. His relics were translated in 1825 with great solemnity to a new altar at the present-day church of San Costanzo.

On his feast day, "torcolo", a ring-shaped cake made of pine nuts, raisins, and dried fruit, is a traditional food in Perugia.

In art, Costantius is often represented as a bishop wearing a mitre and robe and bearing a crozier. He frequently appears in the company of another Perugian patron saint, Sant'Ercolano (Herculanus of Perugia). His feast day is 29 January.

== See also ==
- Abundius of Umbria, martyred in Umbria in 303.
