= Herculanus of Perugia =

Bishop of Perugia and Catholic Saint

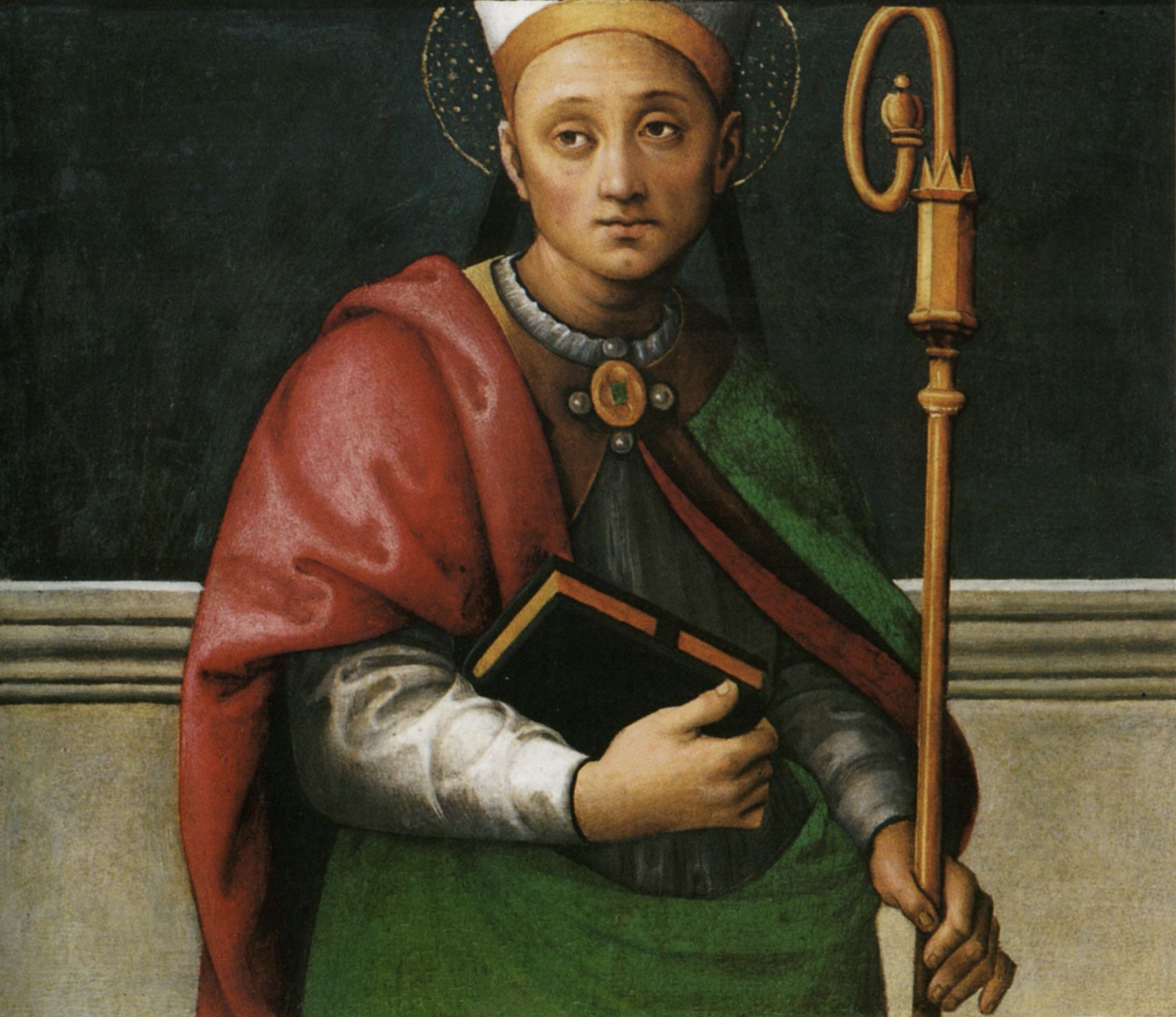
- Pietro Perugino, Sant'Ercolano, 1495-1500, Perugia, Galleria Nazionale dell'Umbria.

Bishop and martyr
- Died: 549 AD; Kingdom of the Ostrogoths
- Venerated in: Eastern Orthodox Church; Roman Catholic Church
- Canonized: Pre-Congregation
- Feast: November 7; also March 1
- Patronage: Perugia

Herculanus of Perugia (Italian: Ercolano; died 549 AD) was a bishop of Perugia. He was canonized as a saint by the Catholic Church and is recognised as patron saint of Perugia. His main feast day is November 7; his second feast is celebrated on March 1. According to Pope Gregory the Great in his Dialogues, Herculanus suffered martyrdom when Totila, king of the Ostrogoths, captured Perugia in 549.

Before the city was captured, Herculanus is said to have tried to save the city by feeding the last sack of grain to the last lamb. This was meant to give the Ostrogoth forces the impression that the Perugians had food to spare, and were able to feed a weak lamb with their precious grain. With food to spare, they were thus able to withstand the siege. However, Totila was not fooled by this trick and captured the city just the same.

Totila is said to have given orders for Herculanus to be completely flayed. However, the Ostrogoth soldier who had to perform this task took pity on the bishop and decapitated Herculanus before the flaying had been completed.

Gregory writes that forty days after the head of Herculanus had been cut off, it was found to have been miraculously reunited to his body.

The inhabitants of the castle of Cisterna in Umbria, above the River Puglia, were under Perugian rule, and were obliged to send three pounds of wax to Perugia for the feast of St Herculanus.

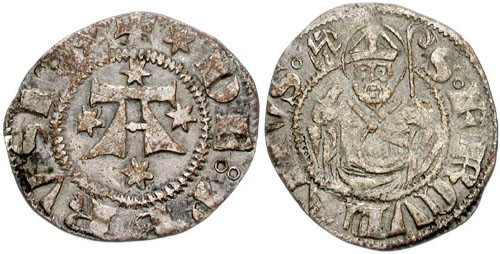
Perugian coin of the 15th century (CNG Coins). It depicts the half-length bust of St. Herculanus, holding a crozier.
