= Galleria Nazionale dell'Umbria =

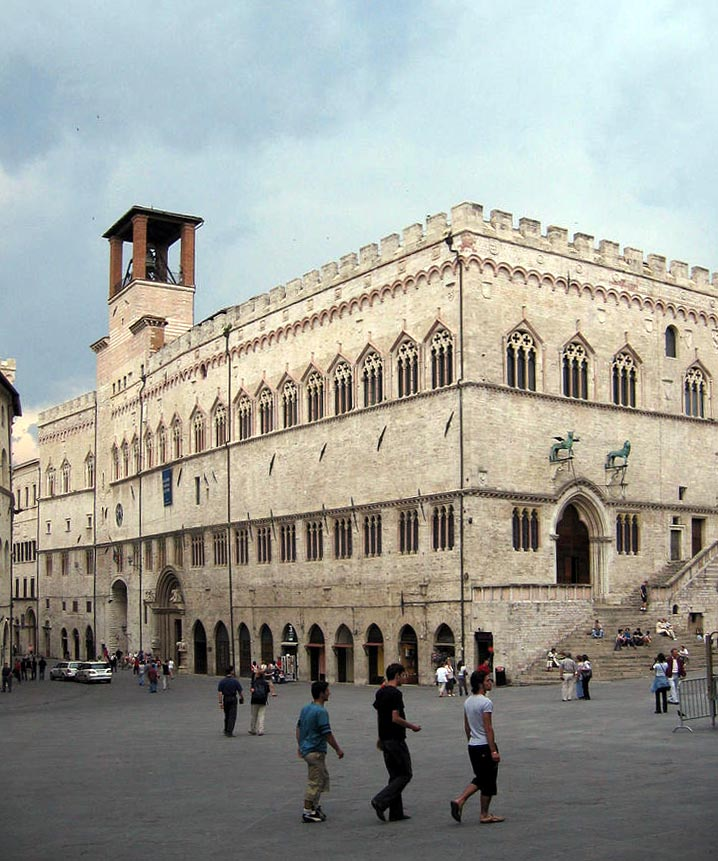
- The Palazzo dei Priori, where the collection has been housed since 1878.
- Established: 1878
- Location: Corso Vannucci 19, 0612 Perugia, Italy
- Coordinates: 43.1097°N 12.3879°E
- Type: Art museum, Historic site
- Website: gallerianazionaledellumbria.it

The Galleria Nazionale dell'Umbria (English: National Gallery of Umbria) the Italian national paintings collection of Umbria, housed in the Palazzo dei Priori, Perugia, in central Italy. Located on the upper floors of the Palazzo dei Priori, the exhibition spaces occupy two floors and the collection comprises the greatest representation of the Umbrian School of painting, ranging from the 13th to the 19th century, strongest in the fourteenth through sixteenth centuries. The collection is presented in 40 exhibition rooms in the Palazzo. On the second floor of the Gallery, there is an exhibition space for temporary collections, changed several times a year.

== History ==
The collection's origins lie in the foundation of the Perugian Accademia del Disegno in the mid-16th century. The Academy was originally based in the Convento degli Olivetani at Montemorcino, where it began to assemble a collection of paintings and drawings. The town became part of the French department of Trasimène in 1798 and its religious houses were suppressed. This suppression was repeated by the united Kingdom of Italy from the 1860s onwards - both suppressions shifted a large number of paintings and artworks from church to state ownership.

In 1863, the civic paintings collection was formally named after Pietro Vannucci, but the problem of establishing an appropriate site to house the collection was not solved until 1878, when it moved into the third floor of the Palazzo dei Priori in the town centre. With the addition of acquisitions, donations and bequests, the pinacoteca became the Regia Galleria Vannucci in 1918, under the patronage of the king. The name was later changed to Galleria Nazionale dell'Umbria. Over the years the entire complex of Palazzo dei Priori has been repeatedly affected by renovations and functional adaptation. The museum path, inaugurated in its current form in 2006, occupies an area of 4000 square meters on two floors.

== Collections ==
Chronologically ordered, the permanent collection has Renaissance and Medieval paintings and sculptures from Italian artists such as Arnolfo di Cambio, Nicola Pisano, Giovanni Pisano, Duccio, Gentile da Fabriano, Fra Angelico, Benozzo Gozzoli, Giovanni Boccati and Piero della Francesca. The particular attention of the collection is given to the Umbrian masters; Benedetto Bonfigli, Bartolomeo Caporali, Fiorenzo di Lorenzo, Perugino, Pintoricchio and their students and followers.

A brief overview of the museum in the official website lists:

First Floor

- Halls 1–4 13th and 14th-century paintings and sculptures, including Nicola and Giovanni Pisano, and Arnolfo di Cambio
- Halls 5–7 15th-century Sienese and Florentine painting, including Duccio di Boninsegna
- Halls 8–11 Renaissance masterworks: Beato Angelico, Benozzo Gozzoli, Piero della Francesca
- Halls 12–16 15th-century Marchigian and Umbrian paintings, including Benedetto Bonfigli
- Hall 17 The "Treasure" - 13th to 15th century jewelry and ivory
- Hall 18 Sala del Delegato - umbrian tapestry
- Hall 19 Agostino di Duccio sculptural fragments
- Hall 20 Arti minori (artisan work)
- Hall 21 Cappella dei Priori

Second Floor

- Halls 22–26 Renaissance masterworks: Perugino, Pintoricchio, and Francesco di Giorgio Martini
- Halls 27–30 First half of 16th-century Umbrian painting
- Halls 31–33 Umbrian Mannerism
- Sala dell’Orologio
- Halls 33–34 Martinelli Collection
- Halls 35–37 1500–1600: Classicism and Caravaggisti; Refectory of the Priors
- Hall 38 18th century
- Hall 39 19th-century topography of Perugia
- Hall 40 Luigi Carattoli Collection

== See also ==
- List of national galleries
