= Baglioni Chapel =

Chapel in Spello, Italy

Coordinates: 42°59′23.58″N 12°40′19.85″E

- Cappella Baglioni
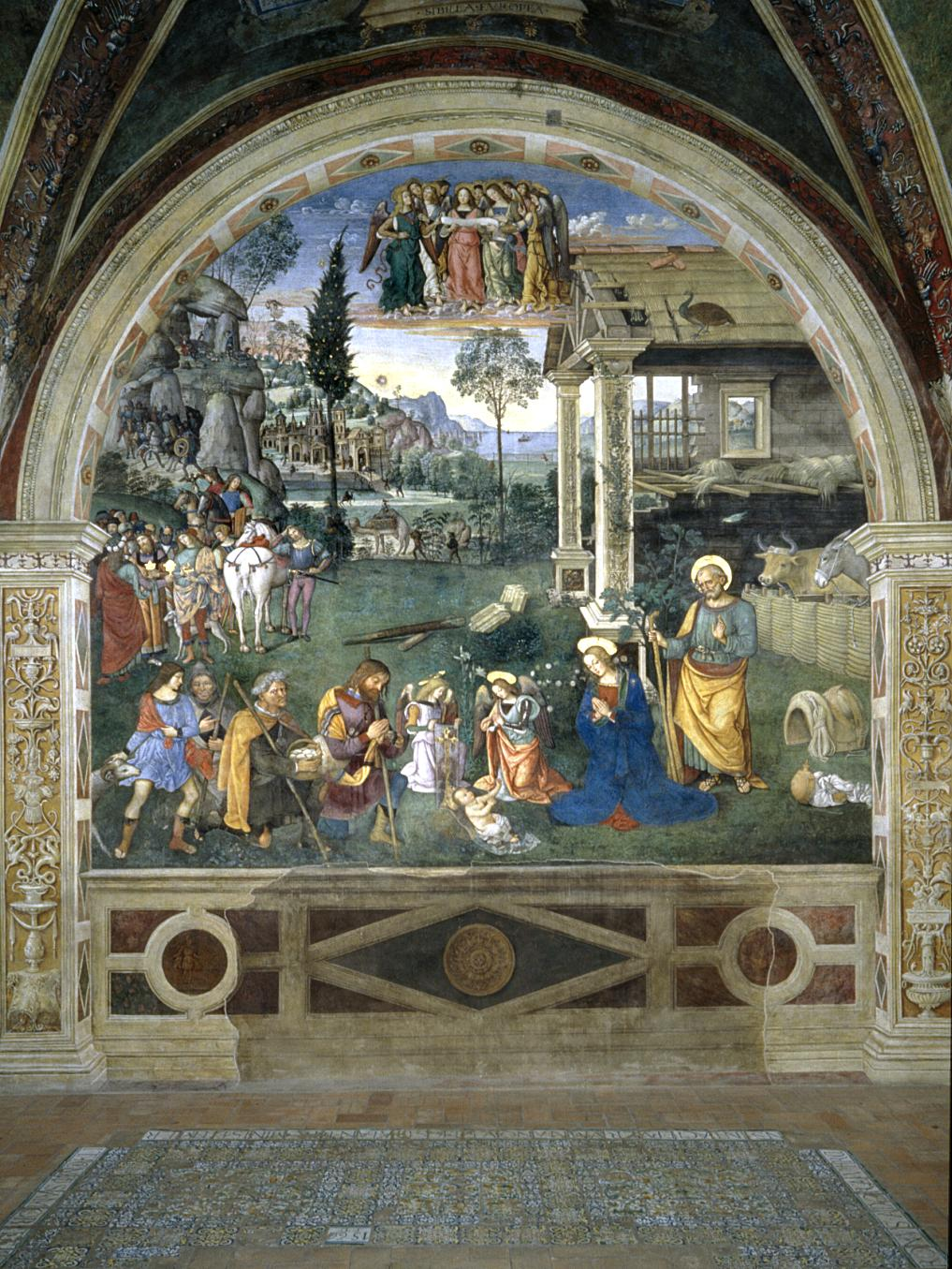
- Frescoes by Pinturicchio
- Baglioni Chapel
- Location: Santa Maria Maggiore, Spello
- Country: Italy
- Denomination: Catholic

History
- Status: Chapel
- Founder: Troilo Baglioni
- Dedication: Virgin of the Assumption

Architecture
- Functional status: Active
- Architectural type: Chapel
- Style: Renaissance
- Completed: 1501

Specifications
- Materials: Fresco, marble

Administration
- Diocese: Roman Catholic Diocese of Assisi-Nocera Umbra-Gualdo Tadino
- Parish: Santa Maria Maggiore, Spello

The Baglioni Chapel is a chapel in the Collegiate church of Santa Maria Maggiore, Spello, central Italy. It is known for its Renaissance frescoes executed by Pinturicchio from c. 1500 to 1501.

== History ==
The decoration was commissioned by the prior (later bishop) Troilo Baglioni, and the end of the work is assigned to 1501. The work was the last important one by Pinturicchio in Umbria, before his sojourns in Rome and Siena. The paintings, typically for Pinturicchio, were executed rapidly thanks to a well-organized workshop, with other masters painting above his drawings.

In the later 16th century, the chapel received a pavement with Deruta ceramics. It was restored in 1976–77 and provided with an air conditioning system against the effects of humidity.

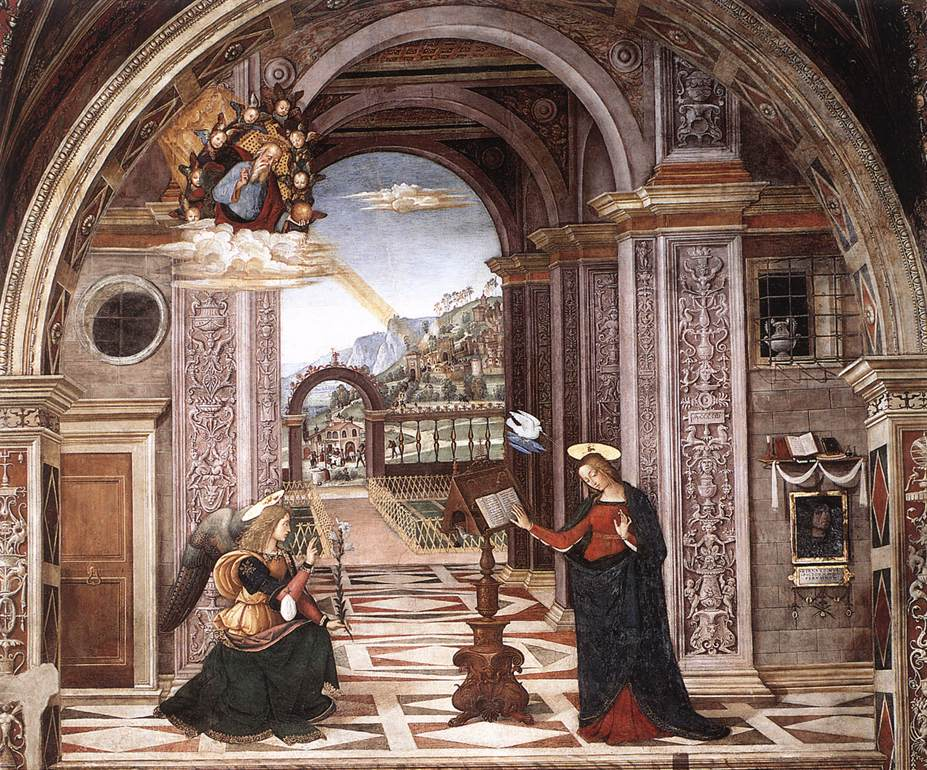
The Annunciation.

== Description ==
The chapel has a quadrangular floor plan with a cross-vault. The frescoes' theme is stories from the childhoods of Mary and of Jesus. The vault contains four Sibyls, sitting on thrones and flanked by cartouches with prophecies of the coming of Jesus. Largely damaged and over-painted, they were perhaps made by Bartolomeo Caporali. The wide grotesque candelabra on the ogives are perhaps from the same artist, due to similarities to those he painted in church of Sant'Antonio Abate at Deruta.

The three main scenes, in the shape of lunettes, occupy the three available walls and are enclosed within painted pillars and arches. The latter's painted intrados has geometrical and rosetta decorations, and creates the illusionistic effect of a Greek-cross plan.

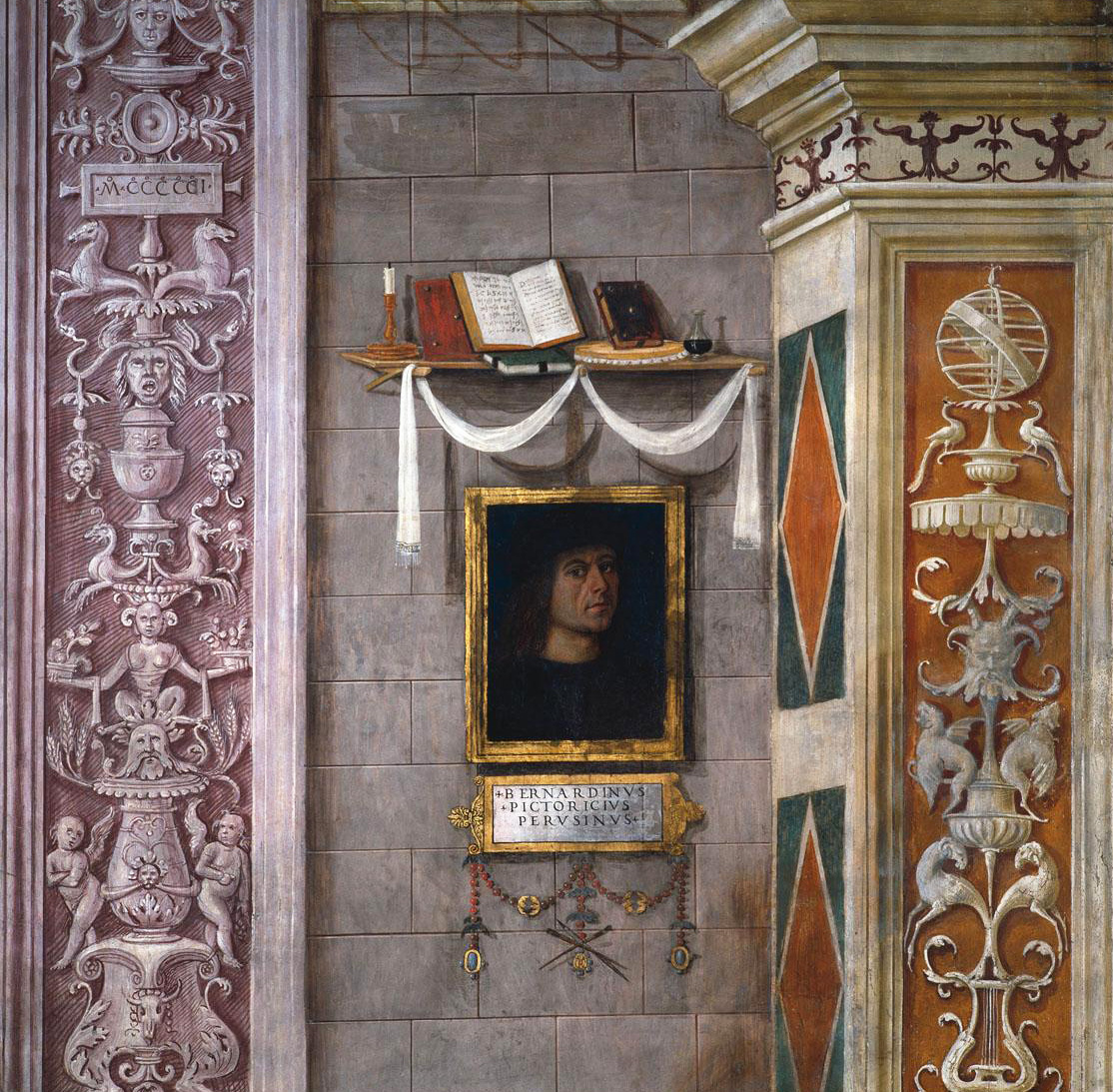
Detail of Pinturicchio's self-portrait in the Annunciation.

=== Annunciation ===
The left wall shows the Annunciation, set in a large Renaissance loggia whose pavement, depicted in geometrical perspective, leads, behind the hortus conclusus, to a richly detailed landscape. The main characters are conventional ones: Mary is distracted from reading by an angel, who kneels to bless her with a white lily in one hand, a symbol of her virginal purity. In the upper part God the Father is depicted, surrounded by angels, emitting a ray of light incorporating the Holy Ghost in the form of a dove.

The right part of the fresco shows a window with a grid; on the left is a shelf with books and an amphora: under it is a self-portrait of Pinturicchio, featuring the dedicatory bejewelled inscription, "BERNARDINVS PICTORICIVS PERVSIN[VS]".

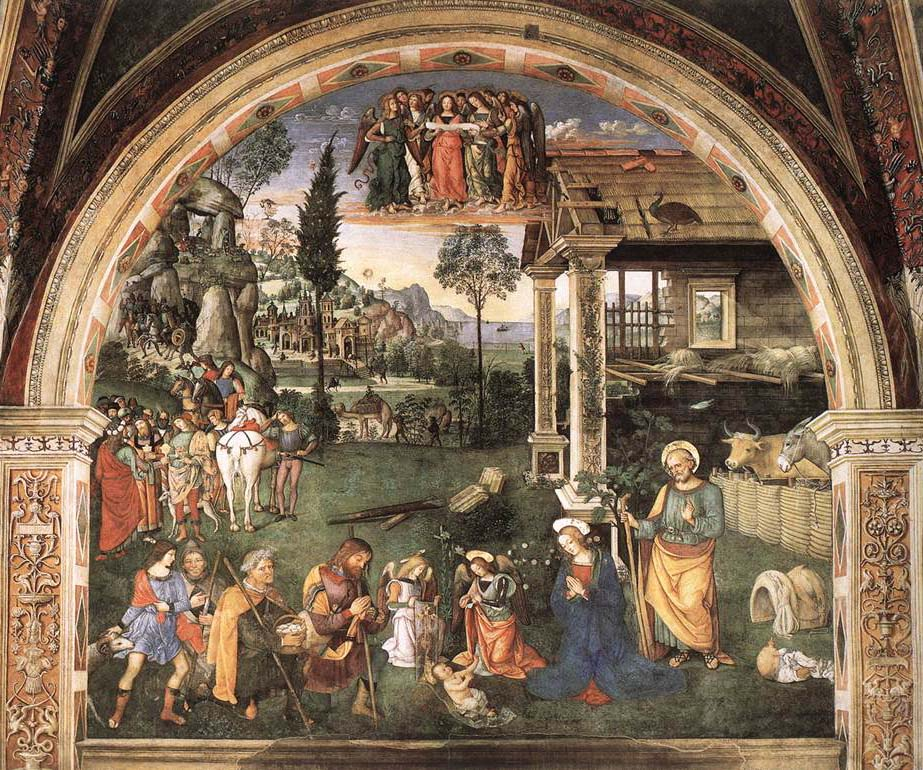
The Adoration of the Shepherds.

=== Adoration of the Shepherds ===
The central wall features the Adoration of the Shepherds, depicting the arrival of the Magi procession in the background. The scene is set on a lawn before the stable, portrayed with sotto in su perspective. A landscape can be seen behind a window in the stable.

The shepherds in the foreground have expressive and detailed features, after the fashion of early Netherlandish painting which influenced Pinturicchio. The young man on the left with a goat is depicted with a more idealized beauty, inspired by ancient reliefs with sacrifice motifs. The group of the Madonna with Child re-uses the typology of the Adoration of the Shepherds painted by Pinturicchio in the Presepio Chapel of Santa Maria del Popolo in Rome.

In the upper part there is a choir of angels. The background is rich in detail, including a well-defined city with a miniature appeal. Among the allegoric elements, a peacock sits on the stable as a symbol of immortality.

=== Dispute with the Doctors ===
The right wall is occupied by the Dispute with the Doctors. The Child Jesus is surrounded by two groups of philosophers of the Temple of Jerusalem, which can be seen in the background and is characterized by a large dome. The scene follows a scheme already used by Pinturicchio in the Bufalini Chapel, which was in turn derived from that adopted by Perugino in his Delivery of the Keys in the Sistine Chapel. The edifice has a central plan and has two niches with decorations, grotesques and ancient statues.

The crowd is formed by standard characters including young spouses, wise men, toothless women and other normal spectators. These include some portraits, such as that of Troilo Baglioni on the left, wearing the dress of a protonotary apostolic.

== Sources ==
- Acidini, Cristina (2004). "Pintoricchio". Pittori del Rinascimento. Florence: Scala. ISBN 88-8117-099-X.
- "The Baglioni Chapel in the Church of St. Maria Maggiore – Spello". umbriatourism.it. Archived from the original on 17 November 2022.
