= Madonna and Child with a Bishop =

Painting by Pinturicchio

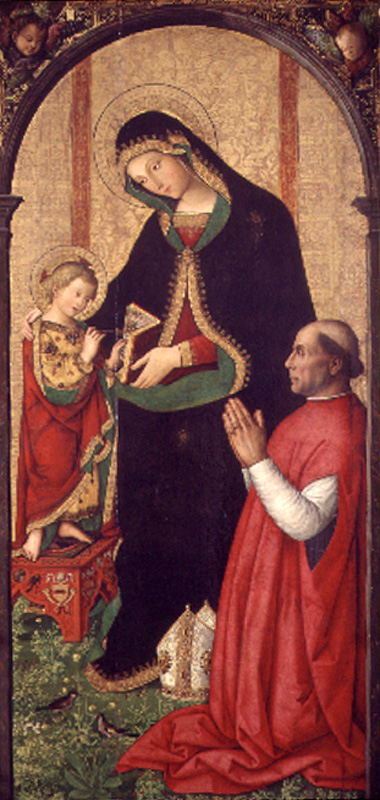
- Artist: Pinturicchio
- Year: c. 1495
- Type: Oil and gold on panel
- Dimensions: 61 cm × 46.5 cm (24 in × 18.3 in)
- Location: Museu de Belles Arts; Valencia

The Madonna and Child with a Bishop is a painting by the Italian Renaissance master Pinturicchio, painted around 1495 and housed in the Museu de Belles Arts of Valencia, Spain.

The work was painted in Rome, when Pinturicchio was the favorite painter of Pope Alexander VI. The pope's cousin, Francisco Borgia, commissioned a work to send to the family's chapel in the Collegiate of Xàtiva, in Spain, perhaps to celebrate his appointment as bishop of Teano (1495). The painting was long considered as the work of the artist's collaborators, due to the presence of 19th century repainting and yellowing: however, later restoration showed the delicate quality of the work and the sumptuousness of the style, typical of Pinturicchio.

The painting is derived from the Madonna with the Christ Child Writing (c. 1494–1498), which also shows the child in philosopher's garments, standing on a stool (with the Borgia coat of arms), writing on a book which the Virgin is giving to him. This work adds the portrait of the commissioner, painted in profile, kneeling on the right, a position already used by Pinturicchio in the Madonna of Peace (c. 1490). Jesus wears a dalmatic and a pallium, perhaps inspired by local late Antique and medieval mosaics, different from the thin veils which were typical of the contemporary Umbrian and Tuscan schools.

The use of a Gothic golden background and the flowers were adaptations to the taste of the commissioner. The small birds are symbols of the Passion of Christ.

== Sources ==
- Acidini, Cristina (2004). "Pintoricchio". Pittori del Rinascimento. Florence: Scala. ISBN 88-8117-099-X.
