= Madonna and Child with Saint Jerome =

Painting by Pinturicchio

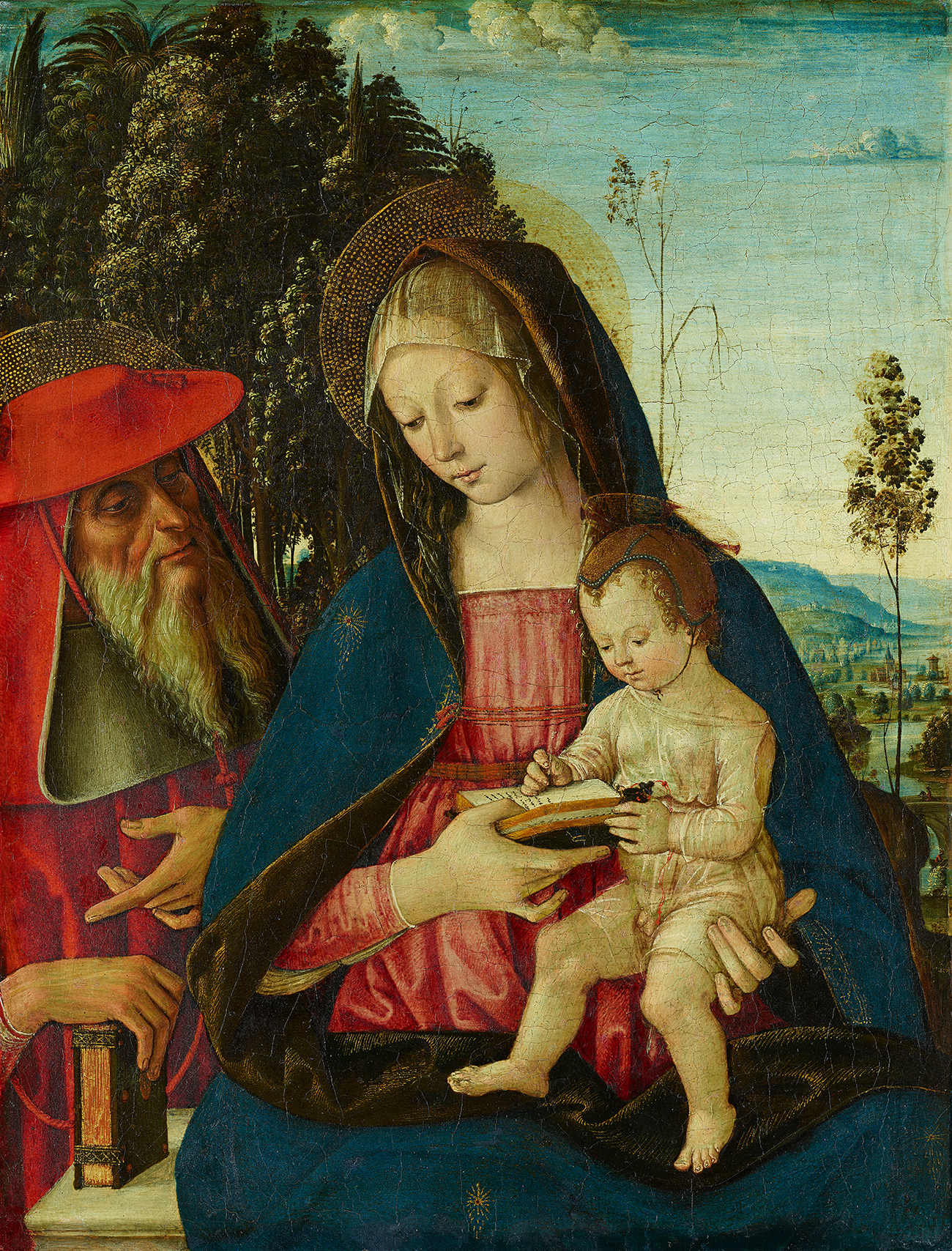
- Artist: Pinturicchio
- Year: 1481
- Medium: Oil on panel
- Dimensions: 49.5 cm × 38 cm (19.5 in × 15 in)
- Location: Gemäldegalerie, Berlin

The Madonna and Child with Saint Jerome is a painting by the Italian Renaissance master Pinturicchio, painted in 1481 and housed in the Gemäldegalerie in Berlin.

== Description ==
The painting shows an uncommon subject, with the Virgin holding the Child who writes on a book, an allusion to his intervention in the Holy Books. On the right is Saint Jerome, recognizable by his cardinal dress, leaving a book on the marble throne where the Madonna sits: in this case this is one of his traditional attributes of knowledge.

The Christ Child wears a pearl-lined coif, which can be seen in another work of Pinturicchio's from this period, the Crucifixion Between Saints Jerome and Christopher (c. 1475), now at the Borghese Gallery. The theme, used also by Fiorenzo di Lorenzo, was later abandoned by Pinturicchio in favour of a free, curly hair.

On the right is an open landscape, a typical element of Renaissance paintings of the Umbrian school.

== Sources ==
- Acidini, Cristina (2004). "Pintoricchio". Pittori del Rinascimento. Florence: Scala. ISBN 88-8117-099-X.
