= Crucifixion Between Saints Jerome and Christopher =

Painting by Pinturicchio

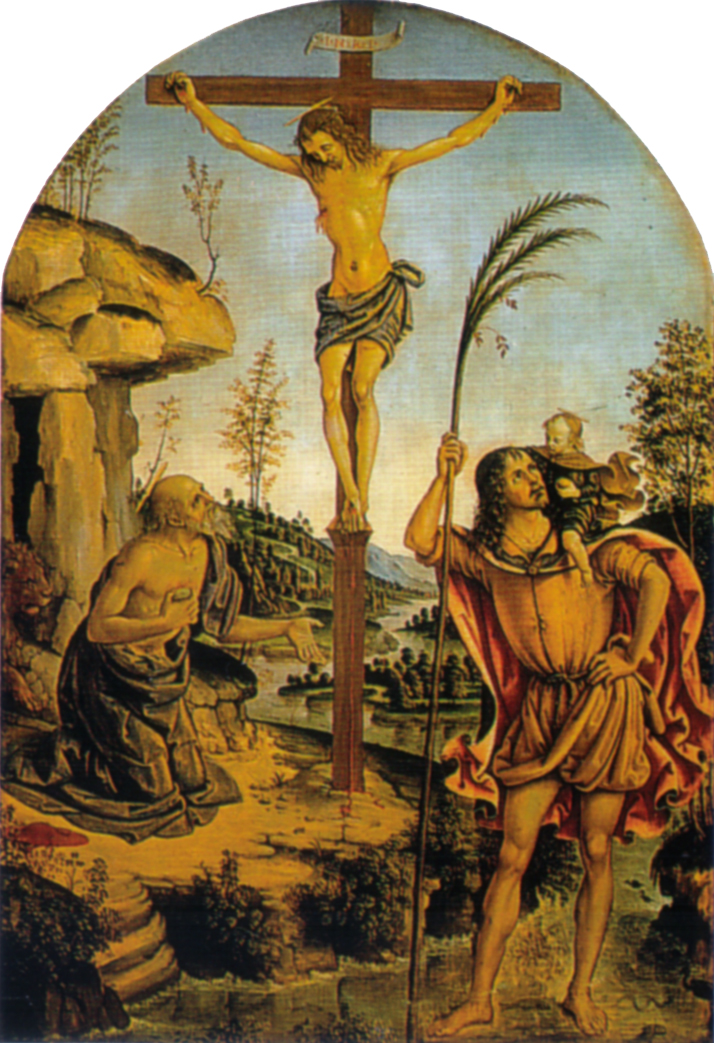
- Artist: Pinturicchio
- Year: c. 1475
- Medium: Oil on panel
- Dimensions: 59 cm × 40 cm (23 in × 16 in)
- Location: Borghese Gallery; Rome

The Crucifixion Between Saints Jerome and Christopher is a painting by the Italian Renaissance master Pinturicchio, painted around 1475 and housed in the Borghese Gallery of Rome, Italy.

It is one of the earliest known works by the Umbrian painter, after some of the panels of the Miracles of Saint Bernardino cycle (1473).

== Description ==
The work depicts the Crucifixion on a river valley background, whose small details show the influence of Flemish painting. On the left-hand side is the penitent Saint Jerome, with the traditional symbols of the tamed lion, the cardinal's hat on the ground, and a stone used to beat his chest. On the right is Saint Christopher holding a martyr's palm and looking at the Christ Child on his shoulder; the latter holds an apple and wears a coif, an element which is present in other early works by Pinturicchio such as the Madonna with Blessing Child in the National Gallery, London.

The work shares the same preparatory drawing, and perhaps the cartoon, of a work by Fiorenzo di Lorenzo.

== Sources ==
- Acidini, Cristina (2004). "Pintoricchio". Pittori del Rinascimento. Florence: Scala. ISBN 88-8117-099-X.
