= Saint Jerome in the Desert (Pinturicchio) =

Painting by Pinturicchio

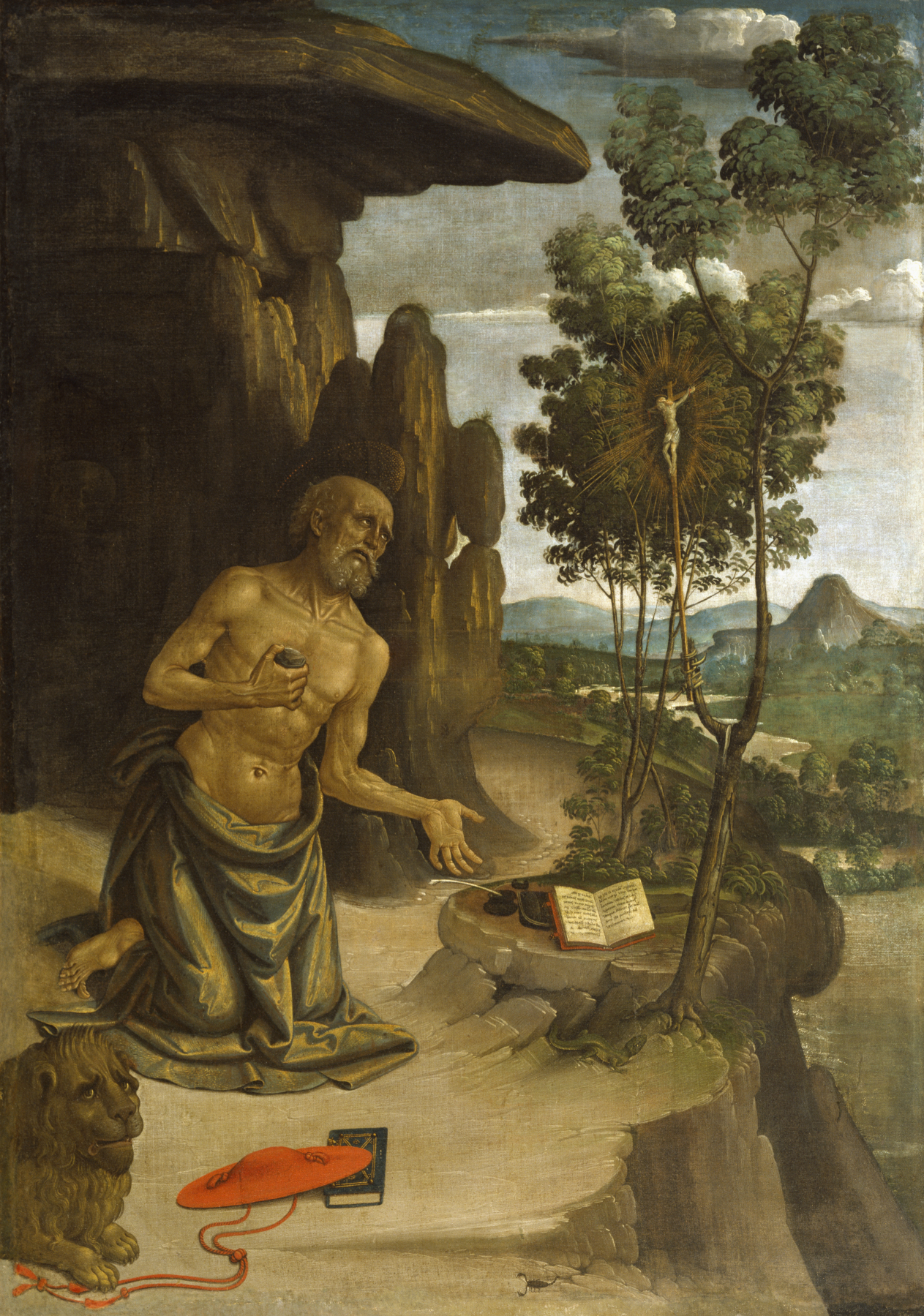
Saint Jerome in the Desert (c. 1475–1480) by Pinturicchio

Saint Jerome in the Desert is a 149.8 by 106 centimetres oil on panel painting by Pinturicchio, executed c. 1475-1480 and showing Jerome. It is one of the earliest dated paintings attributed to the artist and was produced just after his contributions to the Miracles of St Bernardino series (1473).

It is recorded as being in the Bartoccini family collection in Perugia before entering the Galleria Nazionale dell'Umbria, where it remained until it was sold in 1915. Henry Walters acquired it from the art dealer Luigi Grasse in 1916 on the advice of Bernard Berenson. In 1931 it formed part of the original core of the Walters Art Museum in Baltimore, where it still hangs. It was restored in 1966.
