= Madonna with the Christ Child Writing =

Painting by Pinturicchio

Madonna with Writing Child
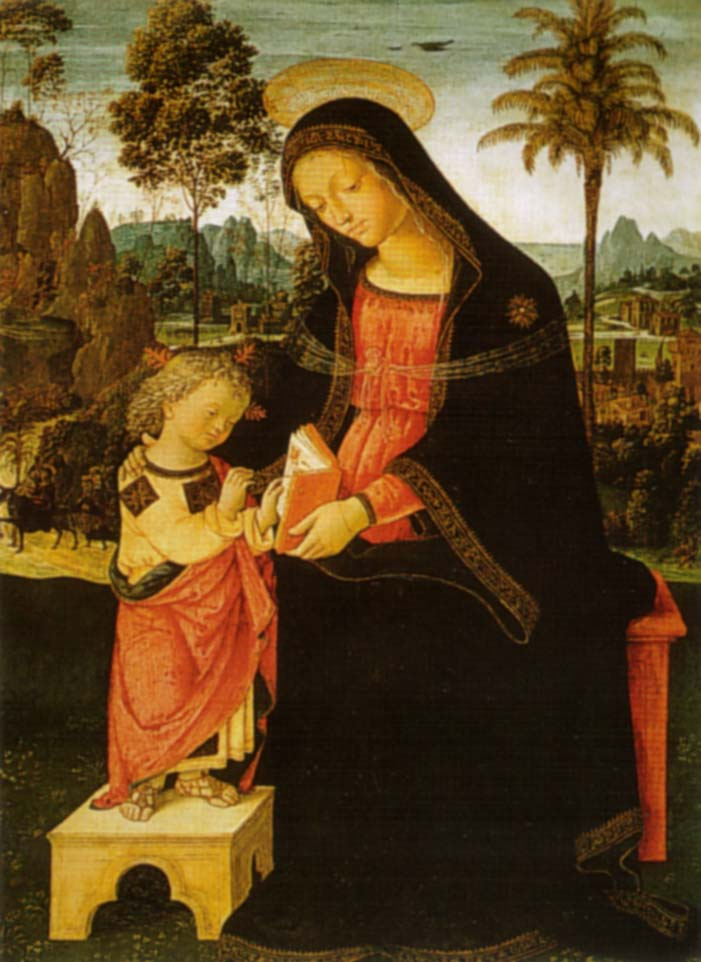
- Artist: Pinturicchio
- Year: c. 1494-1498
- Medium: Oil on panel
- Dimensions: 61 cm × 41.6 cm (24 in × 16.4 in)
- Location: Philadelphia Museum of Art, Philadelphia

The Madonna with the Christ Child Writing is a painting by the Italian Renaissance master Pinturicchio, painted around 1494-1498 and housed in the Philadelphia Museum of Art, in the United States.

The painting is derived from the Madonna of Peace (c. 1490), a simplification for a less acculturated commissioner, perhaps a private family. The Virgin sits on a kind of cask, and is offering a book to the Child, who writes on it. The garments of the Child are perhaps inspired by the late Byzantine mosaics seen by Pinturicchio in Rome.

In the background is a small depiction of the Flight into Egypt and two symmetrical trees, one which is a palm, a symbol of martyrdom.

== Sources ==
- Acidini, Cristina (2004). "Pintoricchio". Pittori del Rinascimento. Florence: Scala. ISBN 88-8117-099-X.
