= Pinturicchio =

Italian painter (1454–1513)

Bernardino Pinturicchio
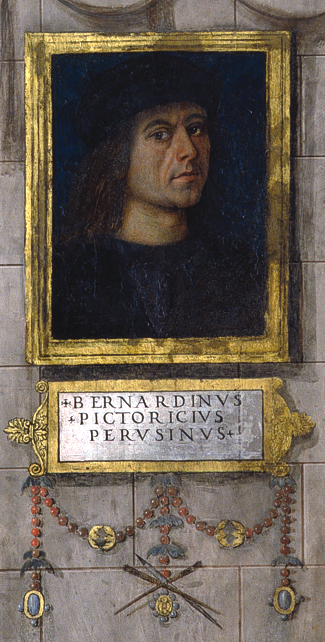
- Self-portrait at the Baglioni Chapel
- Born: Bernardino di Betto; 1454; Perugia, Papal States (present-day Italy)
- Died: 1513 (aged 58–59); Siena, Republic of Siena (present-day Italy)
- Education: Pietro Perugino
- Known for: Painting, fresco
- Movement: Italian Renaissance

The Crucifixion with Sts. Jerome and Christopher, 1471, oil on wood, 59 × 40 cm, Galleria Borghese, Rome

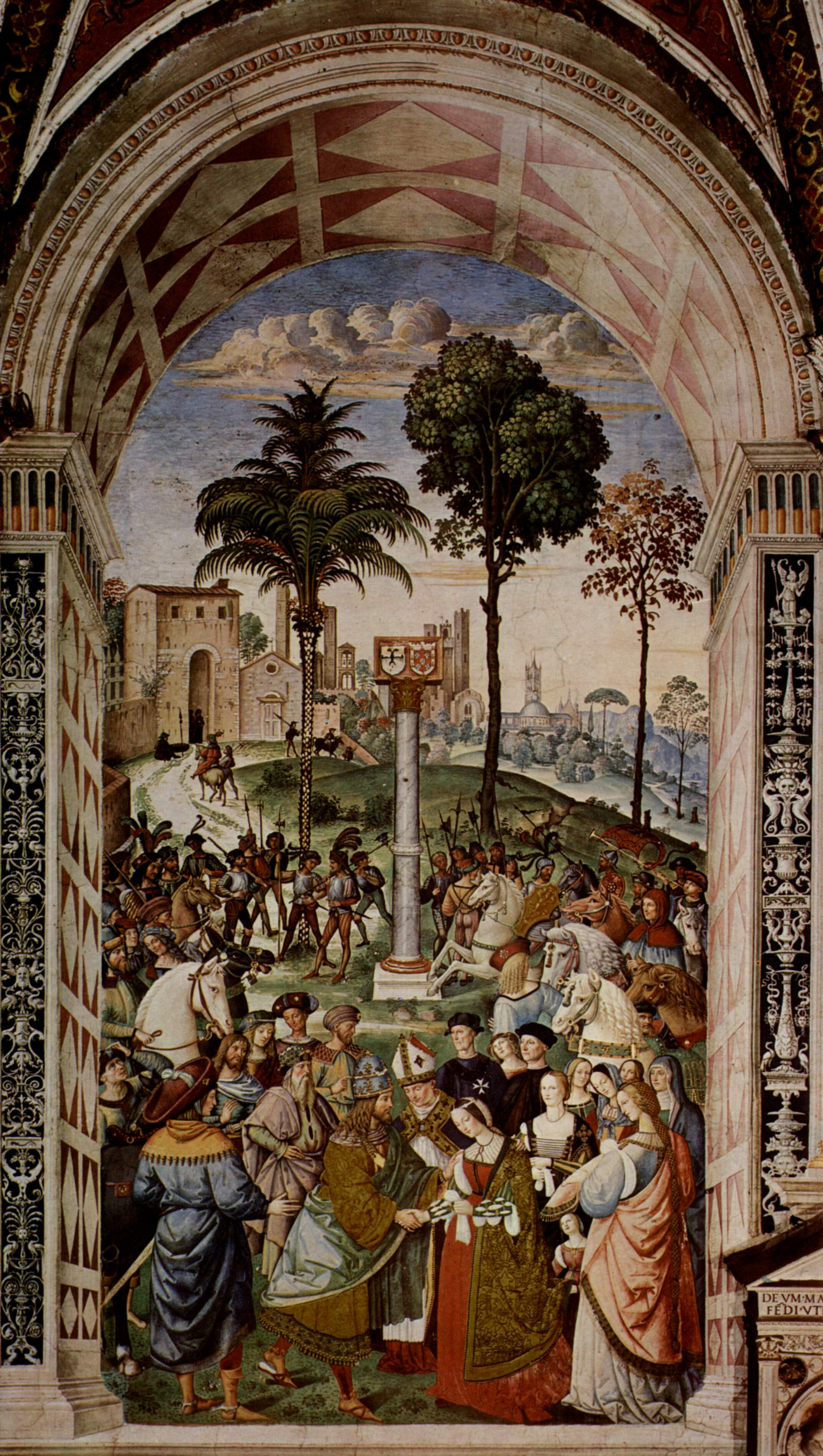
Fresco at Siena Cathedral depicting Pope Pius II

Pinturicchio, or Pintoricchio (US: /ˌpɪntəˈriːkioʊ/, Italian: [pintuˈrikkjo]; born Bernardino di Betto; 1454–1513), also known as Benetto di Biagio or Sordicchio, was an Italian Renaissance painter. He acquired his nickname (meaning "little painter") because of his small stature and he used it to sign some of his artworks that he produced during the fifteenth and sixteenth centuries.

== Biography ==
=== Early years ===
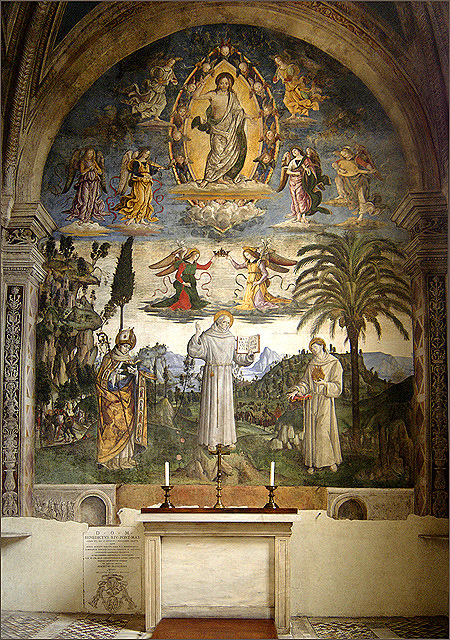
Bernard of Clairvaux between Louis of Toulouse and Anthony of Padua, Bufalini Chapel, Santa Maria in Aracoeli, Rome

Pinturicchio was born the son of Benedetto or Betto di Biagio, in Perugia. In his career, he may have trained under lesser-known Perugian painters such as Bonfigli and Fiorenzo di Lorenzo. According to Vasari, Pinturicchio was a paid assistant of Perugino.

The works of the Perugian Renaissance school are very similar and often paintings by Perugino, Pinturicchio, Lo Spagna, and a young Raphael may be mistaken, one for the other. In the execution of large frescoes, pupils and assistants had a large share in the work, either in enlarging the master's sketch to the full-sized cartoon, in transferring the cartoon to the wall, or in painting backgrounds or accessories.

His assignment in Rome, to decorate the Sistine Chapel, was an experience fraught with learning from prominent artists of the time, including: Sandro Botticelli, Domenico Ghirlandaio, Pietro Vanucci, and Luca Signorelli. The Sistine Chapel was where it is believed that Pinturicchio was collaborating with Perugino to some extent. Pinturicchio's fresco, Assumption of Mary, executed in 1481 on the altar wall of the Sistine Chapel, was destroyed in 1535 to make way for Michelangelo's Last Judgement.

=== Work in Santa Maria del Popolo in Rome ===
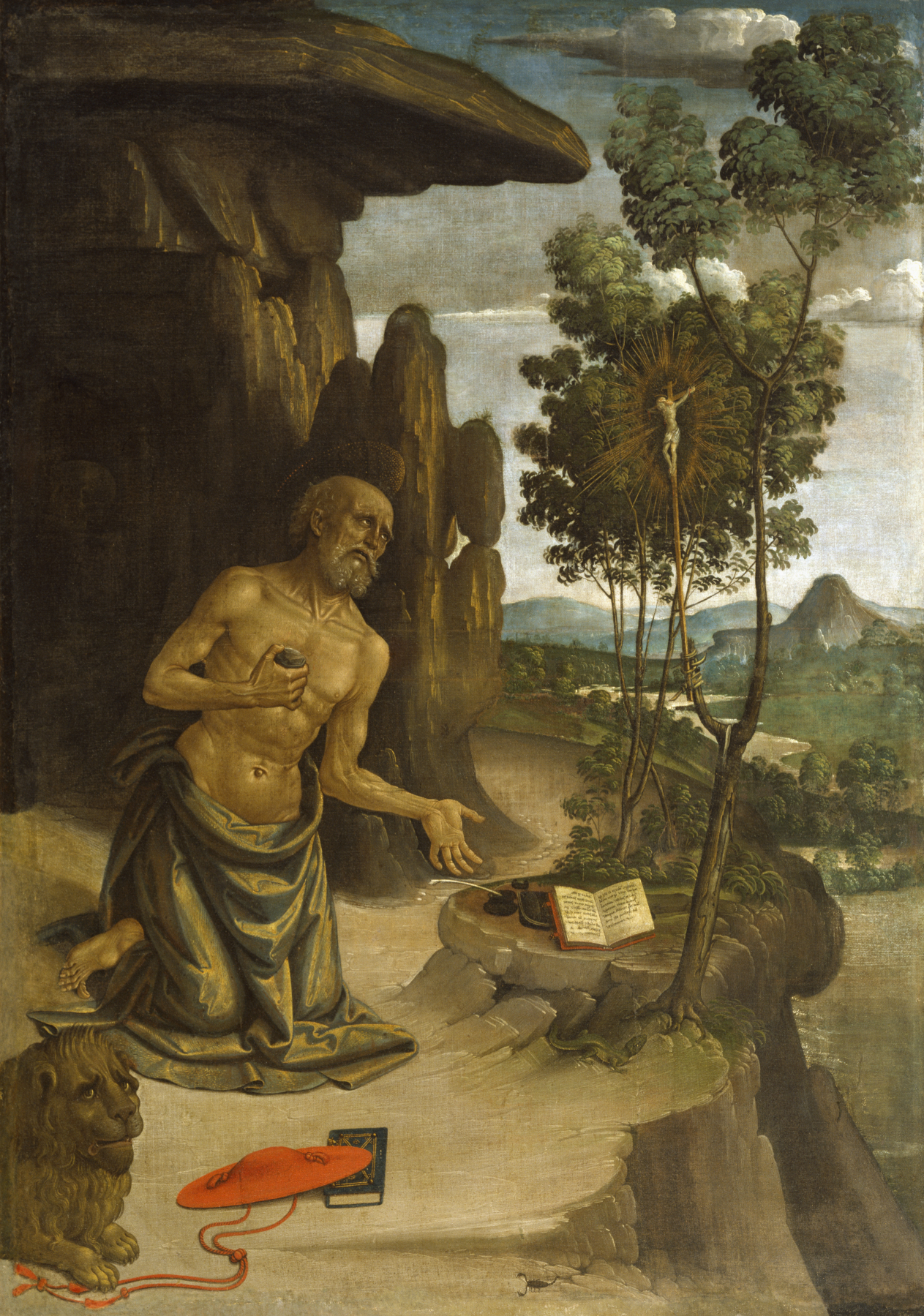
Saint Jerome in the Desert, c. 1475-1480, oil on panel, 149.8 x 106 cm, Walters Art Museum, Baltimore

After assisting Perugino in his frescoes in the Sistine Chapel, Pinturicchio was employed by various members of the Della Rovere family to decorate the Semi-Gods Ceiling of Palazzo dei Penitenzieri as well as a series of chapels in the church of Santa Maria del Popolo, where he appears to have worked from 1484, or earlier, until 1492.

Critic Evelyn March Phillipps sums up his work by saying that the basilica "[w]ould be if it had been left with all its original decorations, one of the finest monuments to Pintoricchio’s art in Italy. A great deal remains, but much has been swept away".

The earliest known of his works is an altarpiece of the Adoration of the Shepherds, in the Della Rovere Chapel, the first chapel (from the west) on the south, built by Cardinal Domenico della Rovere. In the lunettes under the vault, Pinturicchio painted small scenes from the life of St. Jerome. The polychrome grotesque wall decoration on a yellow-gold background probably was inspired by the paintings of the Domus Aurea, and belongs the earliest and highest quality of their kind in Rome.

The frescos he painted in the Cybo Chapel, built by Cardinal Lorenzo Cybo de Mari in the beginning of the sixteenth century, were destroyed in 1682, when the chapel was rebuilt by Cardinal Alderano Cybo. The old fresco of the Virgin and the Child by Pinturicchio was detached from the wall and sent by the cardinal to Massa in 1687. The fragment was re-used as the altarpiece of the Ducal Chapel of the Cathedral of Massa.

The third chapel on the south is that of Girolamo Basso della Rovere, nephew of Pope Sixtus IV, and bishop of Recanati. The Basso Della Rovere Chapel contains an altarpiece, Madonna enthroned between Four Saints, and on the eastern side a fresco of the Assumption of the Virgin. The vault and its lunettes are richly decorated with small paintings of the Life of the Virgin, surrounded by graceful arabesques; and the dado is covered with monochrome paintings of scenes from the lives of saints, illusionistic benches, and gracefully and powerfully drawn figures of women in full length, in which the influence of Luca Signorelli may be traced.

In the Costa Chapel, Pinturicchio or one of his helpers painted the Four Latin Doctors in the lunettes of the vault. Most of these frescoes are considerably injured by moisture and have suffered little from restoration. The last paintings completed by Pinturicchio in this church are found on the vault behind the choir, where he painted decorative frescoes, with main lines arranged to suit their surroundings in a skilful way. In the centre is an octagonal panel, Coronation of the Virgin, and surrounding it, are medallions of the Four Evangelists. The spaces between them are filled by reclining figures of the Four Sibyls. On each pendentive is a figure of one of the Four Doctors enthroned under a niched canopy. The bands that separate these paintings have elaborate arabesques on a gold ground, and the whole is painted with broad and effective touches, very telling when seen (as is necessarily the case) from a considerable distance below.

== Works in the Vatican Library ==
In 1492, Pinturicchio was summoned to Orvieto Cathedral. However, he was also commissioned by Pope Alexander VI (Borgia) to decorate a recently completed suite of six rooms, the Borgia Apartments in the Apostolic Palace of the Vatican. These rooms now form part of the Vatican Library, and five still retain a series of Pinturicchio frescoes. He worked in these rooms until around 1494, assisted by his pupils, and not without interruption. It was not until Pope Alexander VI died that Pinturicchio left Rome for Umbria, leaving much of the work in Rome to be completed by Michelangelo, Raphael, and others.

Among other important frescoes by Pinturicchio that still exist in Rome and are in good condition, are in the Bufalini Chapel in the southwest sector of Santa Maria in Ara Coeli, probably executed around 1484–1486. On the altar wall is a grand painting of St. Bernardino of Siena between two other saints, crowned by angels; in the upper part is a figure of Christ in a mandorla, surrounded by angel musicians; on the left wall is a large fresco of the miracles performed by the corpse of St. Bernardino, which includes portraits of members of the sponsoring Bufalini family.

One group of three women, the central figure with a child at her breast, recalls the grace of Raphael's second manner. The composition of the main group around the saint's corpse appears to have been suggested by Giotto's painting of St. Francis on his bier that is found in Santa Croce at Florence. On the vault are four noble figures of the Evangelists, usually attributed to Luca Signorelli, but as with the rest of the frescoes in this chapel, they are more probably by Pinturicchio. On the vault of the sacristy of Santa Cecilia in Trastevere, Pinturicchio painted the Almighty surrounded by the Evangelists. During a visit to Orvieto in 1496, Pinturicchio painted in the choir of the Duomo two more figures of the Latin Doctors. For these he received fifty gold ducats. Now, like the rest of his work at Orvieto, these figures are almost destroyed. In Umbria, his masterpiece is the Baglioni Chapel in the church of S. Maria Maggiore in Spello.

Among his panel paintings the following are the most important: an altarpiece for S. Maria de' Fossi at Perugia, painted in 1496–1498, now moved to the city gallery, depicts a Madonna enthroned among Saints, very minutely painted; the wings of the retable have standing figures of St. Augustine and St. Jerome; and the predella has paintings in miniature of the Annunciation and the Evangelists. Another fine altarpiece, similar in delicacy of detail, and probably painted about the same time, is that in the cathedral of San Severino — the Madonna enthroned looks down toward the kneeling donor. In beauty of face and expression, the angels at the sides recall the manner of Lorenzo di Credi or Leonardo da Vinci.

The Vatican galleries have the largest of Pinturicchio's panels — the Coronation of the Virgin, with the apostles and other saints below. Several well-executed portraits occur among the kneeling saints. The Virgin, who kneels at Christ's feet to receive her crown, is a figure of great tenderness and beauty, and the lower group is composed with great skill and grace in arrangement.

In 1504, Pinturicchio designed a mosaic floor panel for the Cathedral of Siena: the Story of Fortuna, or the Hill of Virtue. This was executed by Paolo Mannucci in 1506. On top of the panel, a symbolic representation of Knowledge hands the palm of victory to Socrates.

Among the public collections holding works by Pinturicchio are, the Ashmolean Museum (University of Oxford), Biblioteca Ambrosiana (Milan), the Cleveland Museum of Art, the Courtauld Institute of Art (London), the Denver Art Museum, the Fitzwilliam Museum (University of Cambridge), the Honolulu Museum of Art, the Louvre, the Museum of Fine Arts, Boston, the National Gallery, London, Palazzo Ruspoli (Rome), the Philadelphia Museum of Art, the Pinacoteca Ambrosiana (Milan), Princeton University Art Museum, Walters Art Museum in Baltimore, the Vatican Museums, and the Museum of Fine Arts (Budapest).

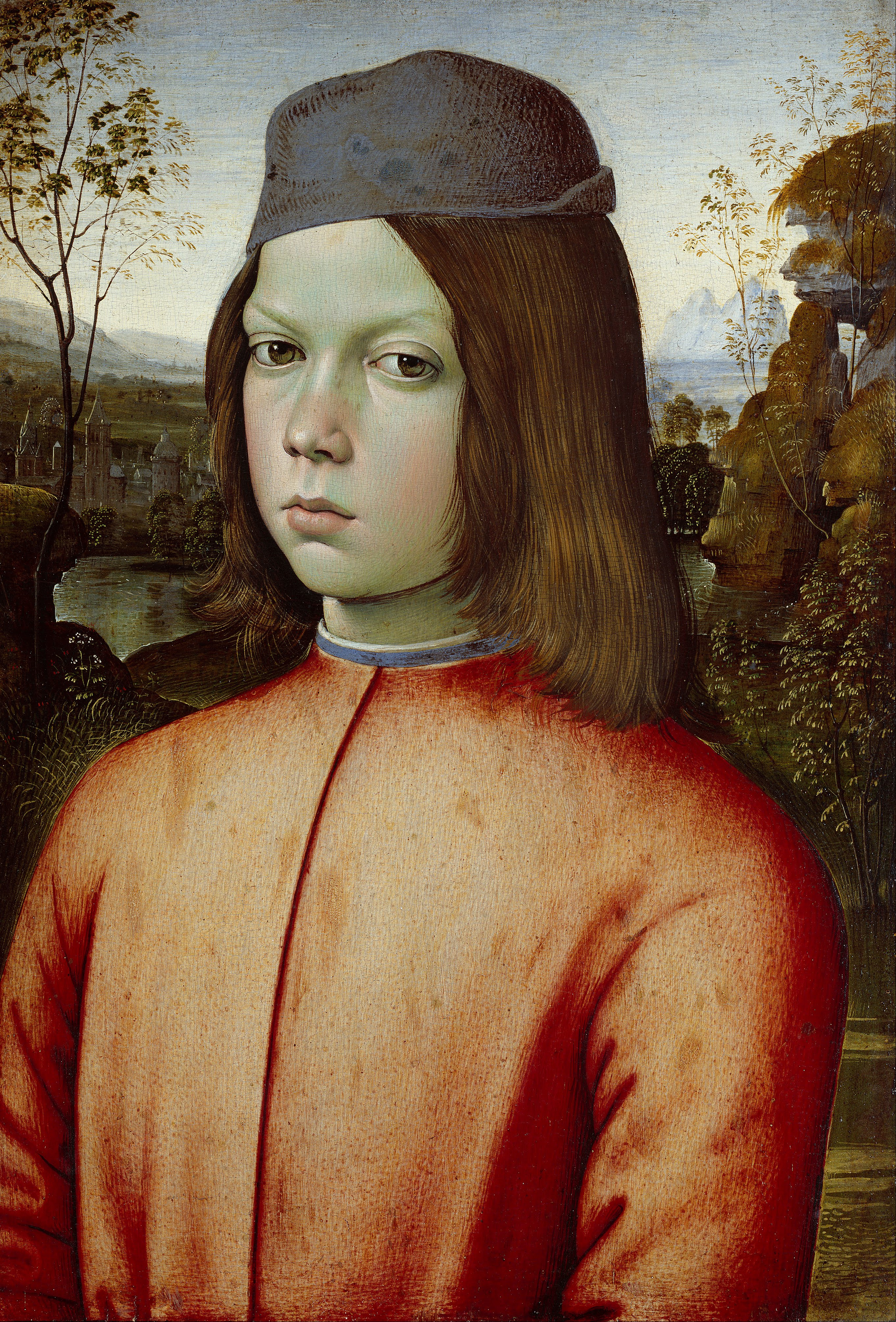
Portrait of a Boy, c. 1500, Gemäldegalerie Alte Meister

== Works ==
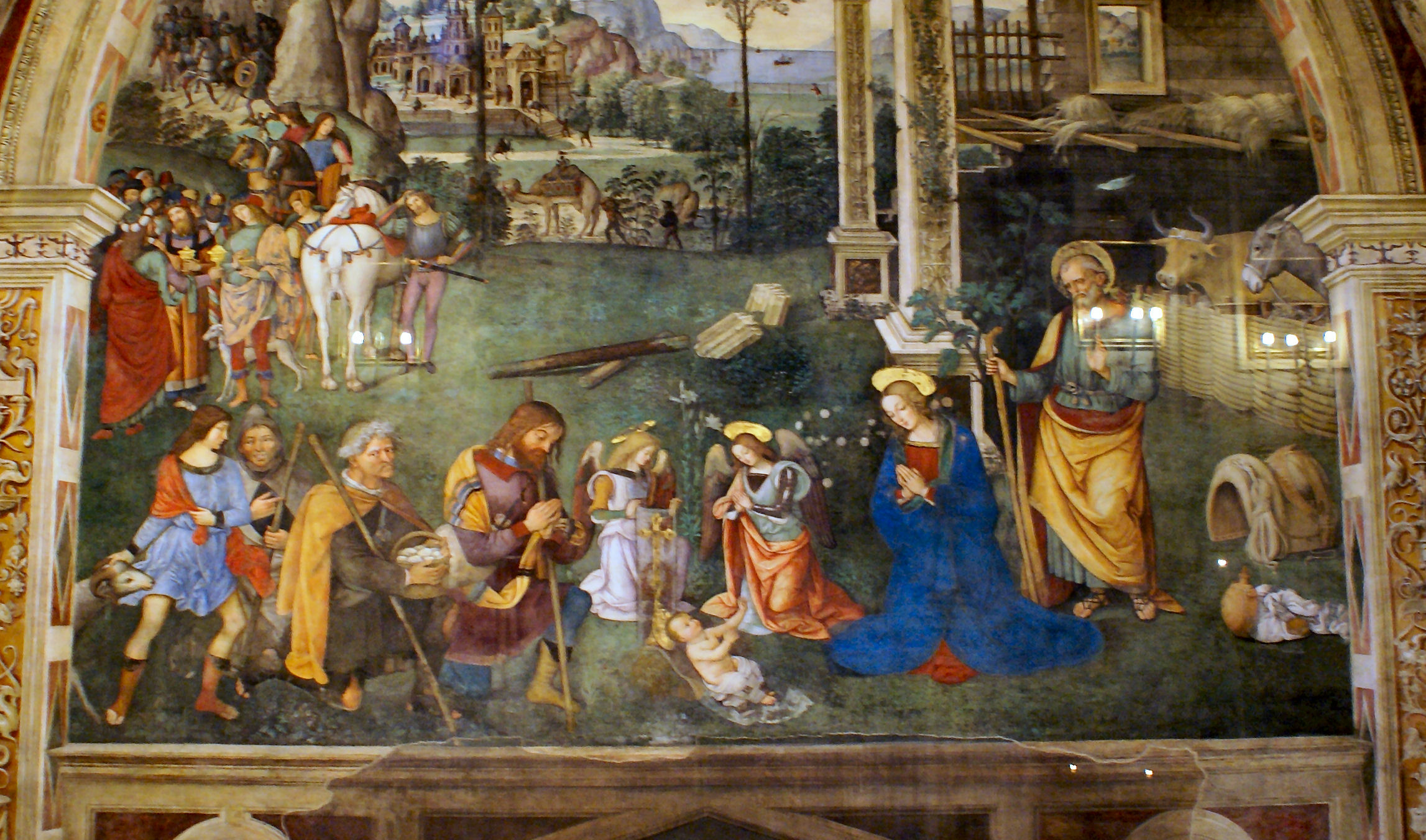
Nativity, at Collegiata di Santa Maria Maggiore, Spello, Italy

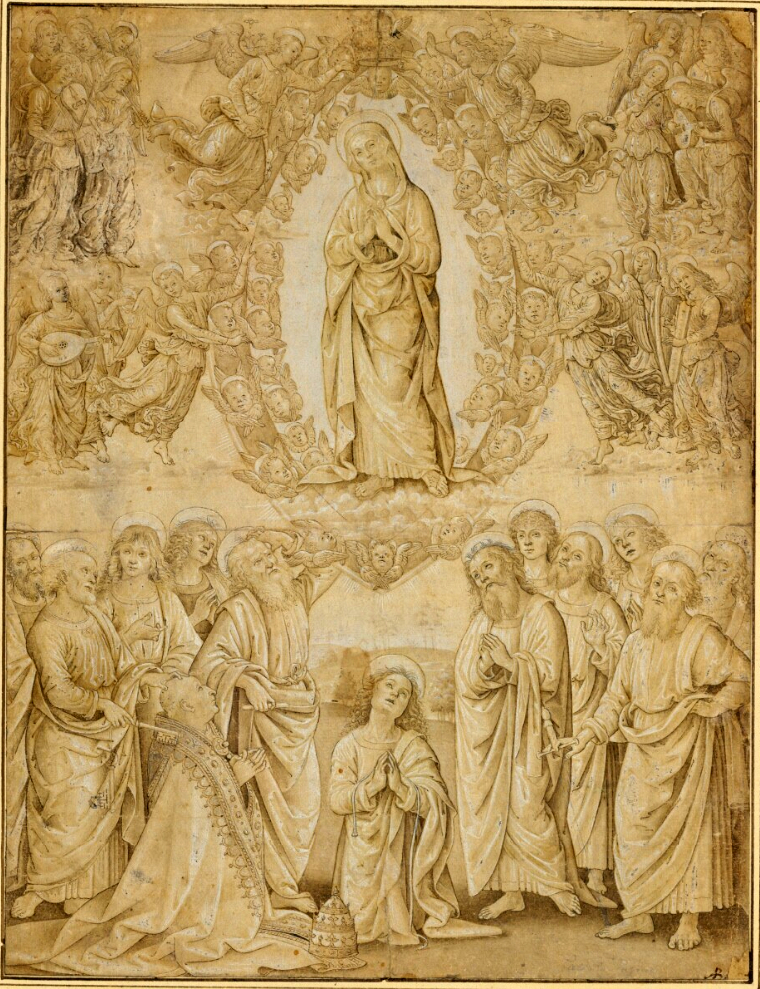
Assumption of Mary (1481), Sistine Chapel, drawing of fresco lost when destroyed to make space for Michelangelo's Last Judgement

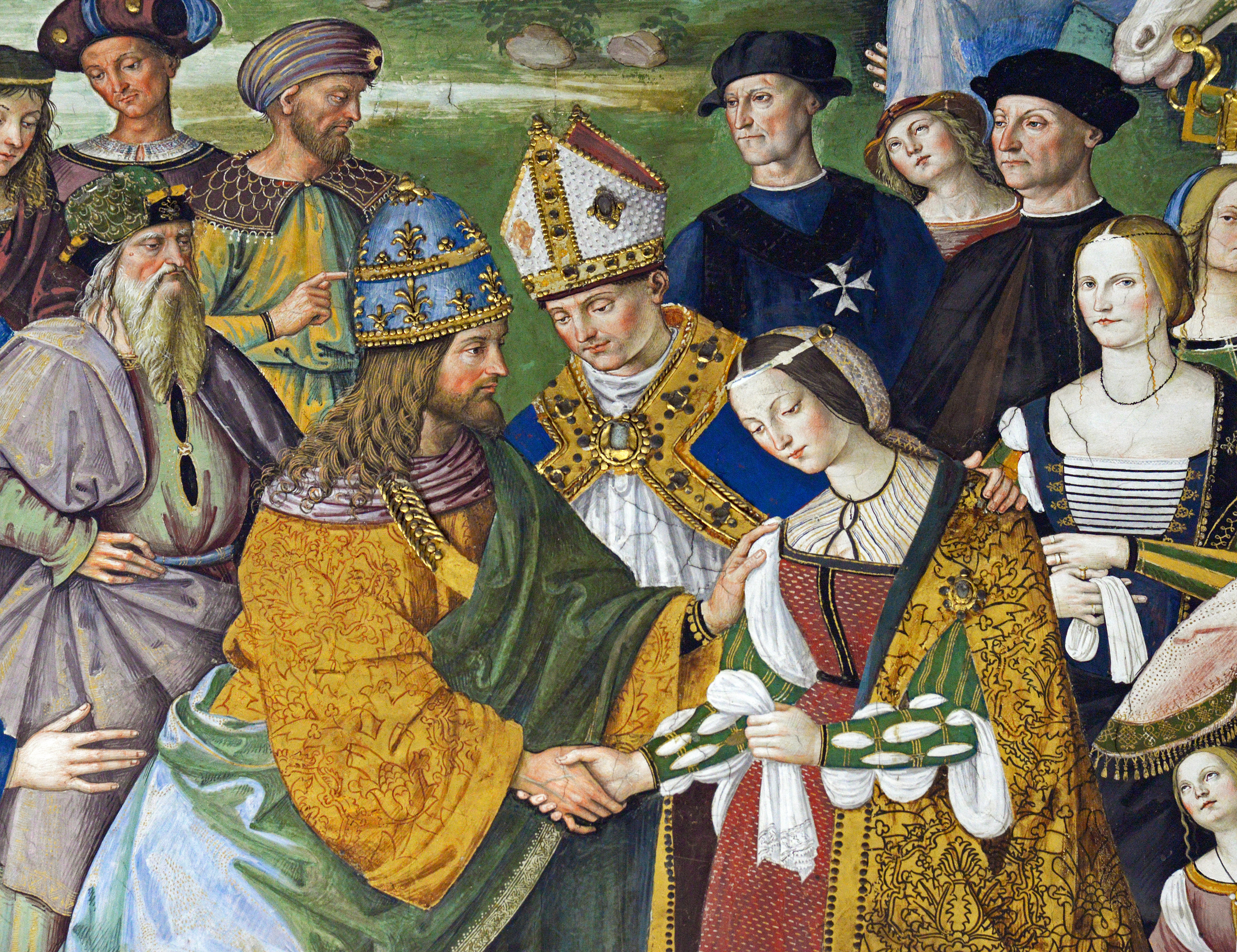
Enea Silvio Piccolomini presents emperor Frederick III with his bride-to-be, Eleanora of Portugal – Siena Cathedral.

- Miracles of St Bernardino (1473), Galleria Nazionale dell'Umbria, Perugia
- Saint Jerome in the Desert (1475–1480), Walters Art Museum, Baltimore, Maryland
- The Crucifixion with Sts. Jerome and Christopher, c. 1475, oil on wood, 59 × 40 cm, Galleria Borghese, Rome
- Della Rovere Chapel (late 1470s to 1482), Santa Maria del Popolo, Rome; including The Adoration of the Child with St. Jerome
- Madonna with Writing Child and St. Jerome (c. 1481), 49.5 × 38 cm, Gemäldegalerie, Berlin
- Assumption of Mary, fresco, Sistine Chapel (1481), later destroyed
- Madonna with Blessing Child (c. 1480), National Gallery, London
- Bufalini Chapel (c. 1484–1486), frescoes, Santa Maria in Ara Coeli, Rome
- Basso Della Rovere Chapel (c. 1484–1492), frescoes, Santa Maria del Popolo, Rome
- Cybo Chapel (c. 1489–1503) in Santa Maria del Popolo, Rome, Italy (destroyed); including The Virgin and the Child now in the Cathedral of Massa, Massa, Tuscany
- Costa Chapel (c. 1488–90), frescos, Santa Maria del Popolo, Rome: The Four Doctors of the Church
- Madonna of Peace (c. 1490), oil on panel, 143 × 70 cm, Pinacoteca civica Tacchi-Venturi, San Severino Marche, Marche
- Semi-Gods Ceiling (c. 1490), oil on paper on wood, Palazzo dei Penitenzieri, Rome
- Nursing Madonna (1492), 29.2 × 21.6 cm, Sarah Campbell Blaffer Foundation, Houston, Texas
- Borgia Apartments (c. 1492–1494), frescoes. Vatican City, Rome
- Madonna col Bambino e paesaggio 59 x 44 cm, Palazzo Baldeschi, Perugia
- Madonna with Reading Child (c. 1494–1498), 33.7 × 25.4 cm, North Carolina Museum of Art, Raleigh, North Carolina
- Madonna with Writing Child (c. 1494–1498), 61 × 41.6 cm, Philadelphia Museum of Art, Philadelphia
- Madonna with Writing Child and Bishop (c. 1495), 158 × 77.3 cm, Museu de Belles Arts, Valencia
- Madonna with Child and St. John the Baptist (c. 1495), 45.5 x 37 cm, National Museum, Warsaw
- Eroli Chapel (1497), frescoes, Cathedral of Spoleto, Spoleto
- Santa Maria dei Fossi Altarpiece, oil on panel and canvas, 513 × 314 cm, Galleria Nazionale dell'Umbria, Perugia
- Portrait of a Boy (c. 1500), Gemäldegalerie Alte Meister, Dresden
- Baglioni Chapel (c. 1500–1501). Santa Maria Maggiore, Spello
- Piccolomini Library (1502–1507), frescoes, Cathedral of Siena, Siena
- Coronation of Pius II (c. 1503–1508), fresco, Cathedral of Siena, Siena
- St. John the Baptist Chapel (1504), Cathedral of Siena, Siena
- Madonna Enthroned with Saints (1506–1508), 318 × 257 cm, church of Sant'Andrea, Spello
- Virgin and Child (51,4 × 40,6) tempera and gold on wood panel, Alicem institute, Luxembourg

== Sources ==
- Herbermann, Charles, ed. (1911). "Pinturicchio" . Catholic Encyclopedia. Vol. 12. New York: Robert Appleton Company.
- Scarpellini, Pietro; Maria Rita Silvestrelli (2004). Pintoricchio. Federico Motta Editore.
- Fabrizio Federici, La diffusione della “prattica romana”: il cardinale Alderano Cybo e le chiese di Massa (1640-1700), in: Atti e Memorie della Deputazione di Storia Patria per le antiche Provincie Modenesi, s. XI - v. XXV, 2003, pp. 315–389.
- Evelyn March Phillips, Pintoricchio, George Bell & Sons, London, 1901.
