= Santa Maria dei Fossi Altarpiece =

Painting by Pinturicchio

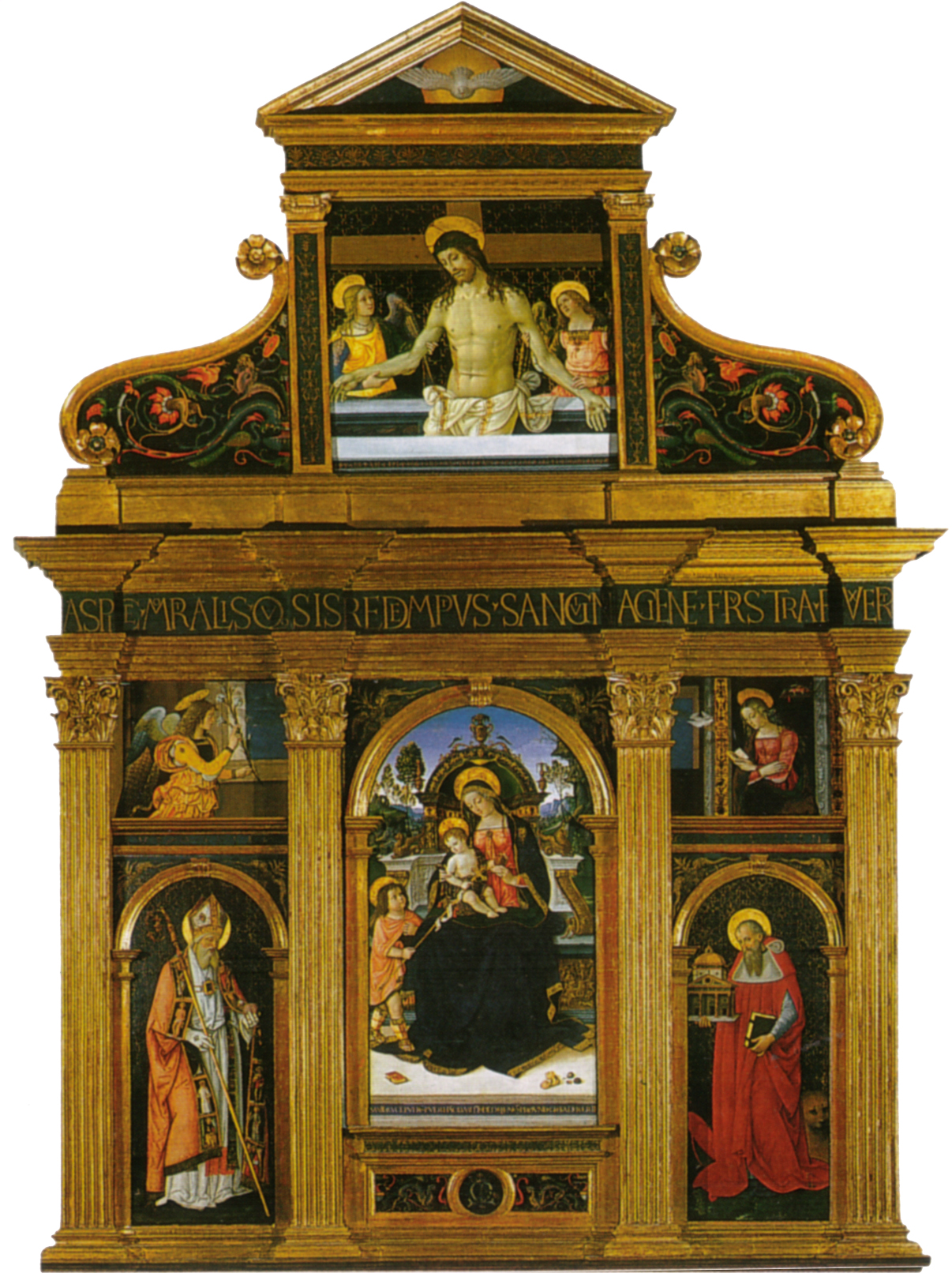
- Artist: Pinturicchio
- Year: 1496-1498
- Medium: oil on canvas and panel
- Dimensions: 513 cm × 314 cm (202 in × 124 in)
- Location: Galleria nazionale dell'Umbria, Perugia

The Santa Maria dei Fossi Altarpiece is a 1496-1498 painting by Pinturicchio, now in the Galleria nazionale dell'Umbria in Perugia. Unusually for an altarpiece, it is painted on canvas stretched over wooden panels.

== History ==
=== Commission ===
It was commissioned for the high altar of the church of Santa Maria degli Angeli in Perugia, also known as Santa Maria dei Fossi. The contract for the work is dated 14 February 1496 and contains detailed instructions for its production and for its wooden frame by Mattia di Tommaso da Reggio, which imitated the architecture of the church's facade. The painter was then at the peak of his powers as a favourite of pope Alexander VI, with whom he had signed a contract for painting the Borgia Apartments.

=== Production ===
The work has seven main panels and two predella panels. The left predella panel has a scene of Augustine's vision of the Christ Child between two tondi of the Evangelists Matthew and Mark, whilst the right predella panel shows Jerome in the desert between tondi of Luke and John.

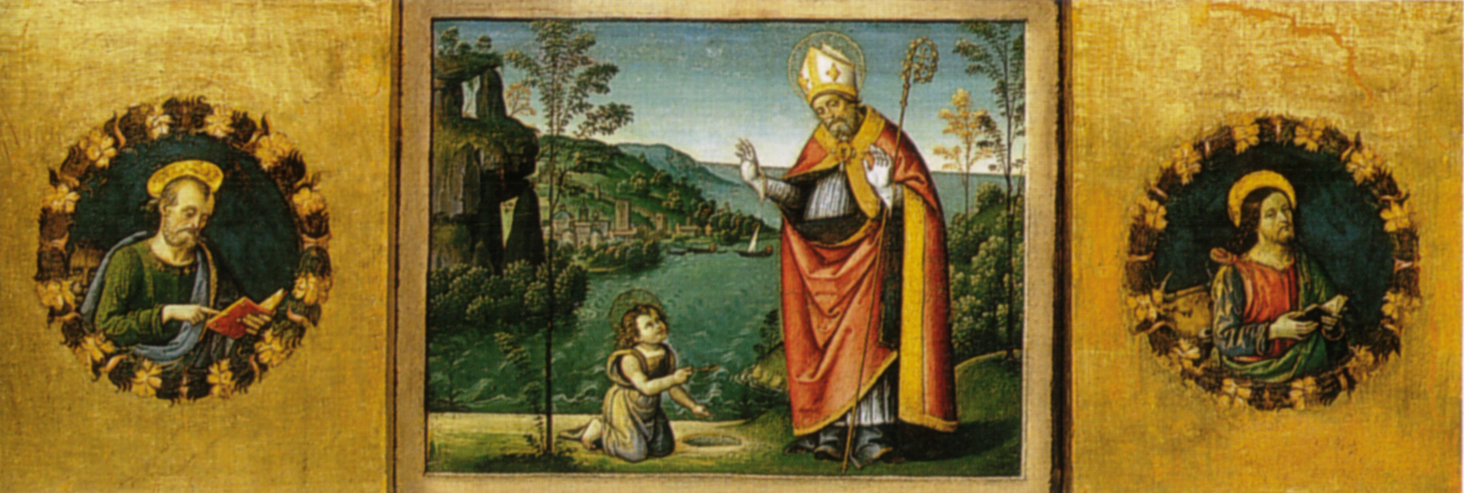
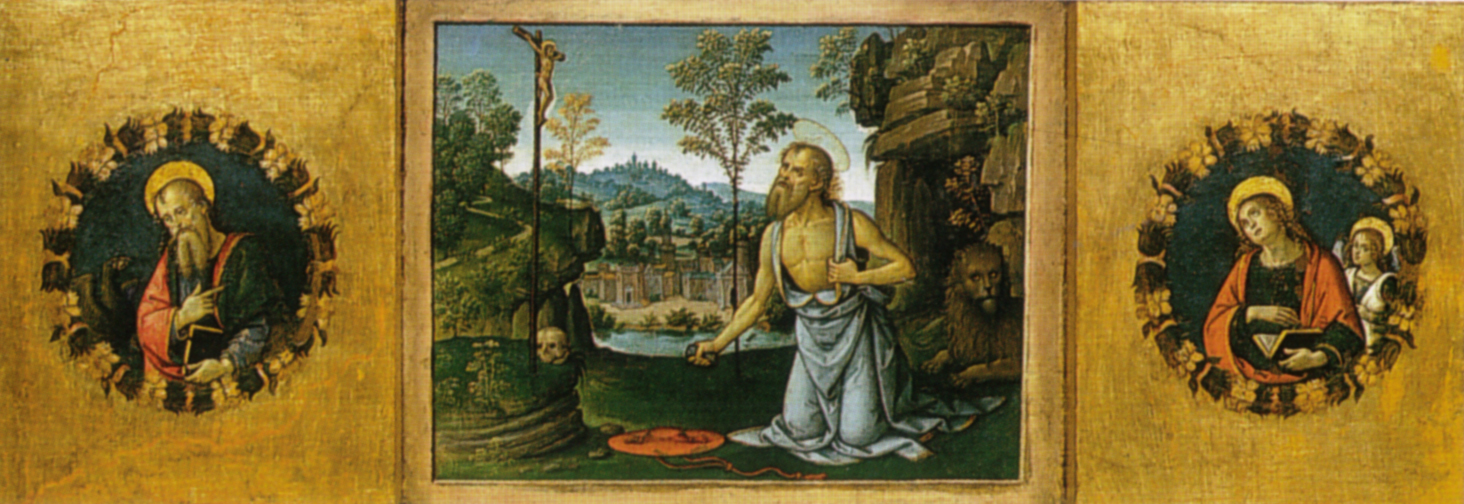
Predella of Pala di Santa Maria dei Fossi

The central panel shows the Madonna and Child with the infant John the Baptist - the Virgin Mary was the church's patron saint. Below John is the Italian inscription "O santo fanciullo, rimetti al Fanciullo questa croce. Non la porterà [Giovanni] a Dio in favore del mondo, ci sarà un altro" (Oh child saint, give the Christ Child back this cross. It shall not bear [John] to God for the world's sake, it shall be for another). The Christ Child holds a pomegranate and fruits are scattered around his mother's feet, all symbolising the Passion. Above these words are the letters B and N, interpreted as the artist's signature, an abbreviation of B[er]N[ardinus]. The reliefs on the Madonna's throne are inspired by those on ancient Roman sarcophagi, then being rediscovered as part of the Italian Renaissance, whilst behind it is an Umbrian landscape.

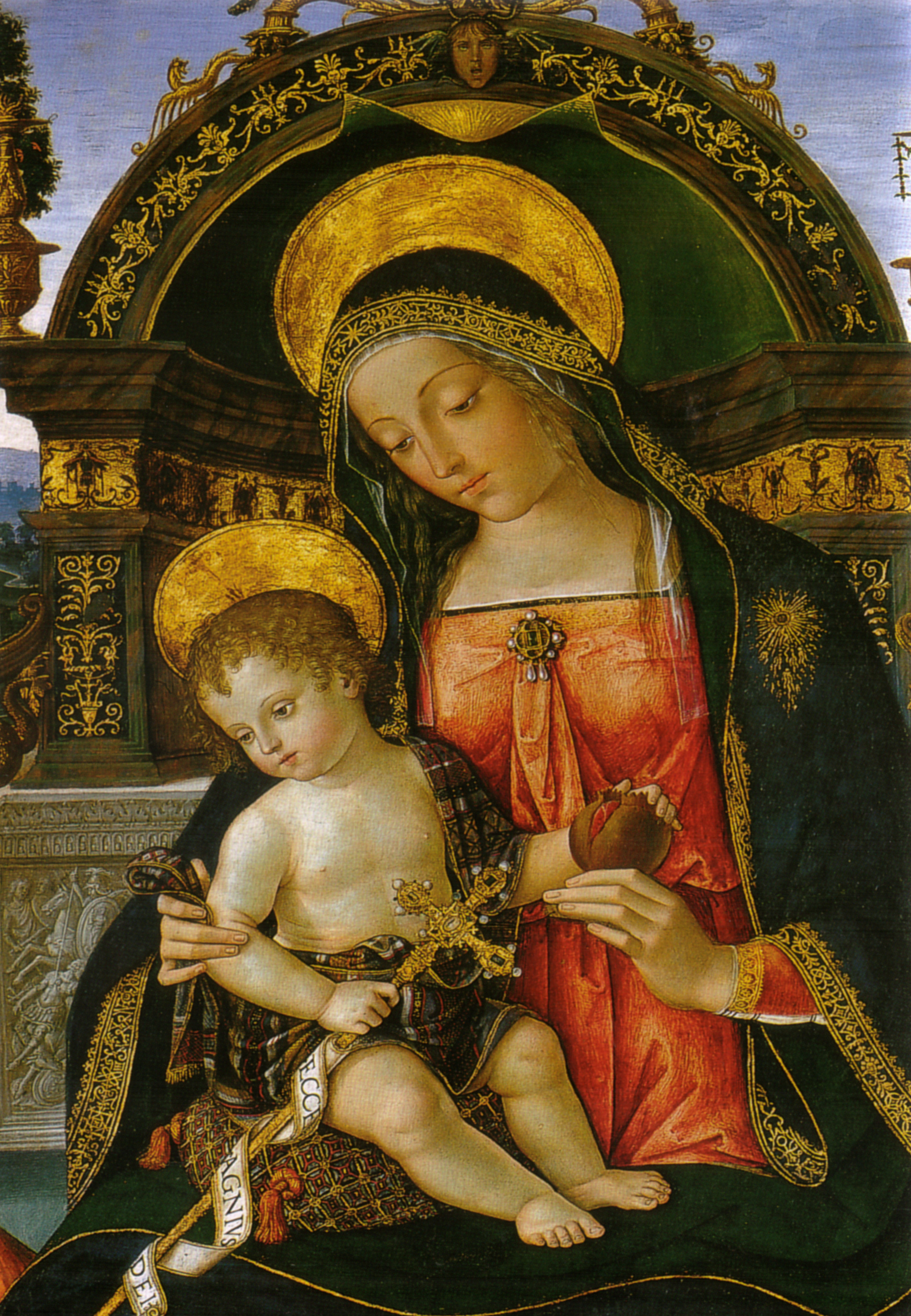
Detail

Two main flanking panels show Augustine of Hippo (holding an apple symbolising original sin and the Passion) and Jerome (holding a small model in his hand showing Santa Maria degli Angeli as it was planned to look after a rebuilding project which was never actually completed). They both stand in front of rich trompe-l'œil wall hangings, influenced by the Spanish textiles in Alexander's court. Above these three main panels is another Italian inscription, "Guarda o mortale da quale sangue sei stato redento. Fa' che non sia scorso invano" (See, oh mortal man, that blood by which you have been redeemed. Do not let it have been in vain.). The contract also stipulated figures of Ubald, Bernard of Clairvaux, Joseph, the local saint Dignamerita of Brescia (a martyr in the Hadrianic persecutions) and other popes, cardinals and devotees - it is unclear if those other panels were ever completed or if they were part of the original decoration of the pilasters, lost when the work was split up in the late 18th century.

Two smaller side panels above Augustine and Jerome form a two-part Annunciation, with Gabriel on the left and Mary on the right - her room shows an early use of grotesque decoration, whilst her books are painted in a style influenced by contemporary Flemish still lifes. The central cymatium shows the dead Christ supported by two angels in front of another fictive wall hanging. At the very top is a tympanum showing the Holy Spirit in the form of a dove.

The painter used the figure of the Madonna in this work as the prototype for other simpler works considered to be more or less entirely autograph works, often painted for use in private devotion. These include Madonna and Child (Huntington Library, San Marino, California), a faithful reproduction of the altarpiece's central panel dating to around 1498, the Davanzale Madonna in the Pinacoteca Vaticana, the Visconti-Venosta Tondo in Rome, the small Madonna in the Fitzwilliam Museum in Cambridge, UK and other works in the Ashmolean Museum, National Gallery of Scotland and the Isabella Stewart Gardner Museum in Boston.

=== Later history ===
Vasari did not see the work, though it was praised by local art historians right up to the 18th century. When the church was suppressed under the Napoleonic occupation, the altarpiece was divided up and the original cornice and decorative panels on the 'pilastrini' were lost. The work was reunited in 1853 and moved into its present home. It was neglected by 20th century art criticism, though in 1960 Carli dated it to the peak of the painter's career and praised the "extraordinary lightness and freshness of its colours". However, he also placed it just before the painter's shift to a less inspired period in which he used compositions from his collection of drawings rather than inventing new ones.
