= Bufalini Chapel =

Chapel in the church of Santa Maria in Aracoeli, Rome

- Cappella Bufalini
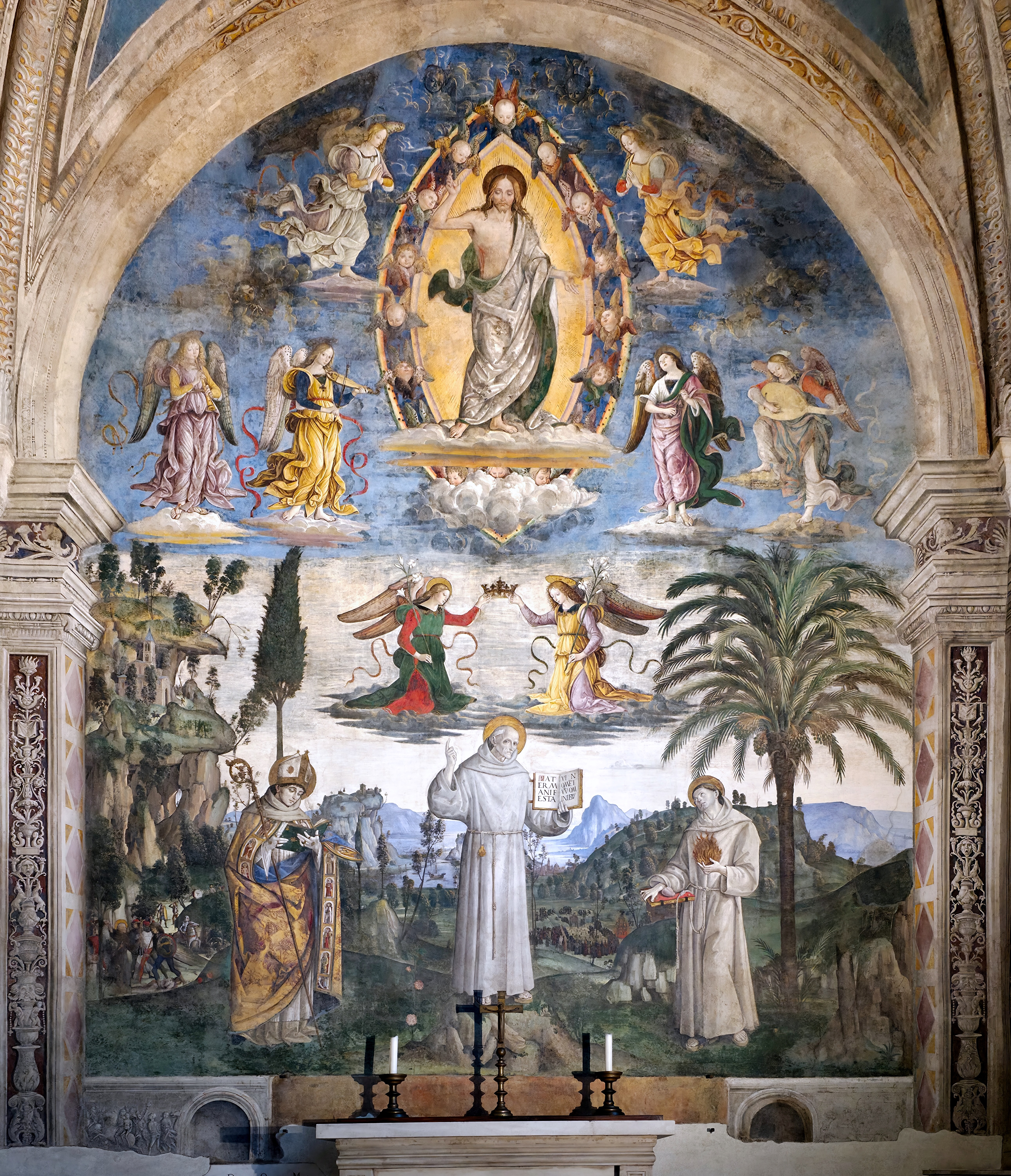
- Pinturicchio’s frescoes in the chapel
- Bufalini Chapel
- 41°53′37.57″N 12°28′58.46″E
- Location: Santa Maria in Ara Coeli, Rome
- Country: Italy
- Denomination: Catholic

History
- Status: Chapel
- Founded: 1484
- Dedication: Saint Bernardino of Siena

Architecture
- Functional status: Active
- Architectural type: Chapel
- Style: Renaissance
- Completed: c. 1484–1486

Specifications
- Materials: Fresco, marble

Administration
- Diocese: Rome
- Parish: Santa Maria in Ara Coeli

The Bufalini Chapel is a side chapel of the church of Santa Maria in Aracoeli, Rome, Italy. The first chapel on the right after the entrance, it houses a cycle of frescoes executed c. 1484-1486 by Pinturicchio depicting the life of the Franciscan friar St. Bernardino of Siena, sainted in 1450.

== History ==
The chapel was commissioned by Niccolò Di Manno Bufalini (Note: His full name was Niccolò Di Manno Bufalini, Di Città Di Castello) (~1450 - 1506) for his mortuary chapel in the church of Santa Maria in Aracoeli. Bufalini was a prelate, citizen of Città di Castello, who worked as abbreviator di parco maggiore (Note: The abbreviators di parco maggiore, which are all prelates draw the Papal bulls, and send them when they are written. (Buck, Charles; Henderson, Ebenezer (1833). A theological dictionary. James Duncan; T. T. & J. Tegg; Simpkin & Marshall. p. 749.)) and consistorial lawyer in Rome. His family coat of arms (a bull with a flower) appears widely in the chapel. Several important painters, including Pietro Perugino, Sandro Botticelli, Luca Signorelli, and Pinturicchio, had finished the wall decoration of the Sistine Chapel (1482), and had returned to their hometowns, with the exception of Pinturicchio, who had formed a workshop including some of the collaborators in that work. Pinturicchio, who had been so far outshone by Perugino's fame, could exploit his presence in Rome to obtain the commission of his first great work, the Bufalini Chapel, also favored by the common origin with Riccomanno Bufalini. The painter had already executed at least one work for the latter's family, a Madonna now in the Municipal Gallery of Città di Castello (c. 1480).

No documents about the works' execution exist, but they are generally dated to around 1484-1486. The frescoes suffered some damage and repainting, and were subsequently restored in 1955-1956 and 1981-1982.

== Description ==
The chapel has a rectangular plan, with a cross-vault and a pavement decorated by Cosmatesque mosaics. The frescoes occupy three walls and the vault, and portray the life and miracles of Bernardino of Siena, a Franciscan Friar recently canonized. The church was in fact held by this monastic order at the time, and the frescoes also include two scenes of St. Francis of Assisi's life. The Bufalini family had strong ties with Bernardino, since the latter had resolved disputes between them and the Baglioni and Del Monte families.

=== Vault ===
The paintings on the vault were the first to be completed. They depict the four Evangelists, within four bright oval almonds, according to a layout inspired by Perugino. The Evangelists' postures were carefully studied and are more lively than those by Perugino.

=== Central wall ===
The central wall is decorated with the Glory of St. Bernardino, on two levels as was the lost Assumption by Perugino. The lower section portrays Bernardino on a rock, with open arms, surmounted by two angels crowning him. He is flanked by the saints Louis of Toulouse and Antony of Padua, while in the background is a landscape inspired by those of Umbria. The upper sector depicts a blessing Christ within an almond, with angels and musicians.

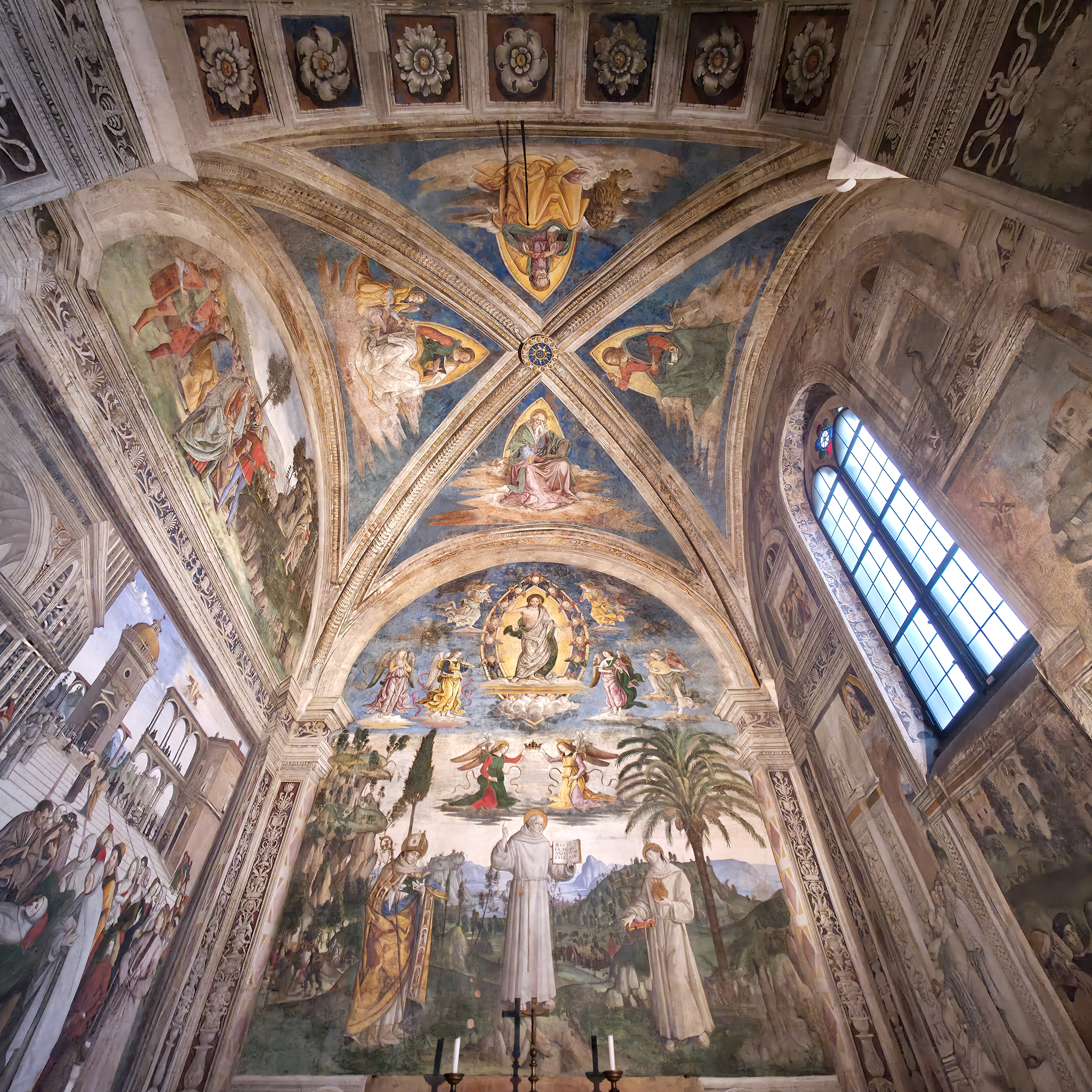
Santa Maria in Aracoeli (Rome), Bufalini Chapel, ceiling

This fresco shows a more lively composition than Perugino's, both in the figures and the rocks in the landscape, which do not follow a symmetrical pattern and are spatially deeper. Bernardino holds a book on which is written PATER MANIFESTAVI NOMEN TVVM OMNIBVS ("Father, I have shown your name to everyone"), the words the friars were chanting as Bernardino passed away on Ascension eve, 1444.

Under the previous scenes is a monochrome band, today only partially readable: It originally housed blind niches and reliefs, of which one remains today with a military procession with prisoners and satyrs. It is one of the first examples of the taste for antiquities which was becoming widespread in Rome at the time, and which was used also by Filippino Lippi in the Carafa Chapel in Santa Maria sopra Minerva.

=== Right wall ===
For the right wall, which features a double mullioned window, Pinturicchio adopted an illusionistic perspective, painting two fake symmetrical windows, one with a blessing Eternal Father and one with a dove, an early Christian symbol of eternal life. The wall contains also two scenes with episodes of the life of St. Francis of Assisi: The first is the Renunciation to the Patrimony, characterized by an oblique perspective, which takes advantage of the piers of the arches, having a grotesque decoration; the second depicts St. Francis Receiving the Stigmata, featuring in the background a view of the Verna Sanctuary over a rocky peak. Under the real window is an illusory opening with five characters: among them is an aged friar, perhaps the convent's prior, and a lay figure that resembles him, perhaps an administrator of the basilica.

=== Left wall ===
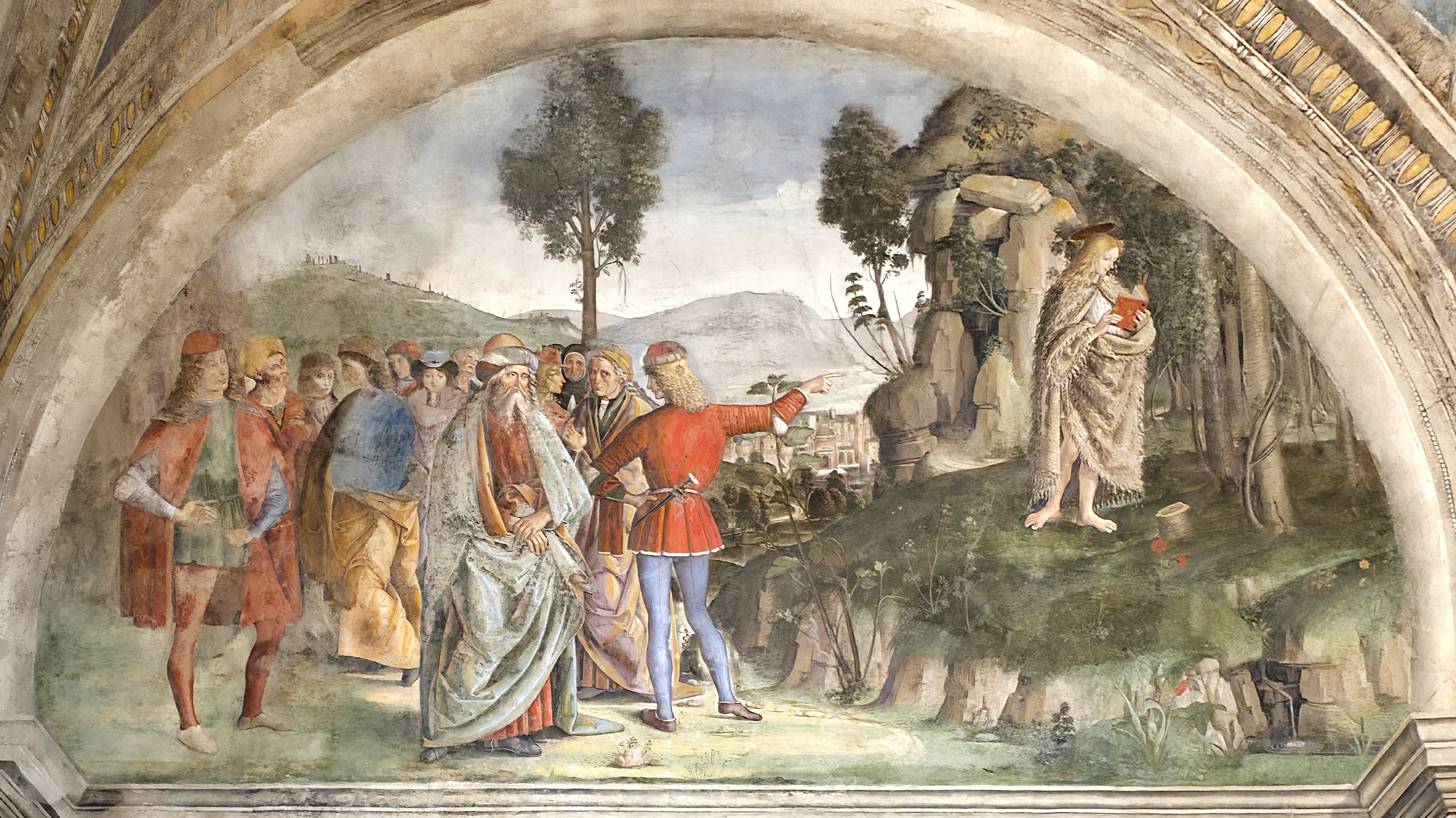
Santa Maria in Aracoeli (Rome), Bufalini Chapel, Left lunette

The left wall comprises two scenes organized vertically, divided by a painted frieze. The upper lunette shows the romitaggio (hermitage) of the young Bernardino; below are the Funerals of Bernardino, set in an urban scene with a chessboard-like pavement, painted using geometrical perspective. The latter has its vanishing point in an edifice with central plan, taken from Perugino's Delivery of the Keys. Pinturicchio, however, departed from that model by using two buildings of different heights at the sides. On the left is a loggiato, supported by piers decorated with fanciful gilded candelabra. On the right is a cubic building connected through a double loggia to the landscape and the bright sky in the background.

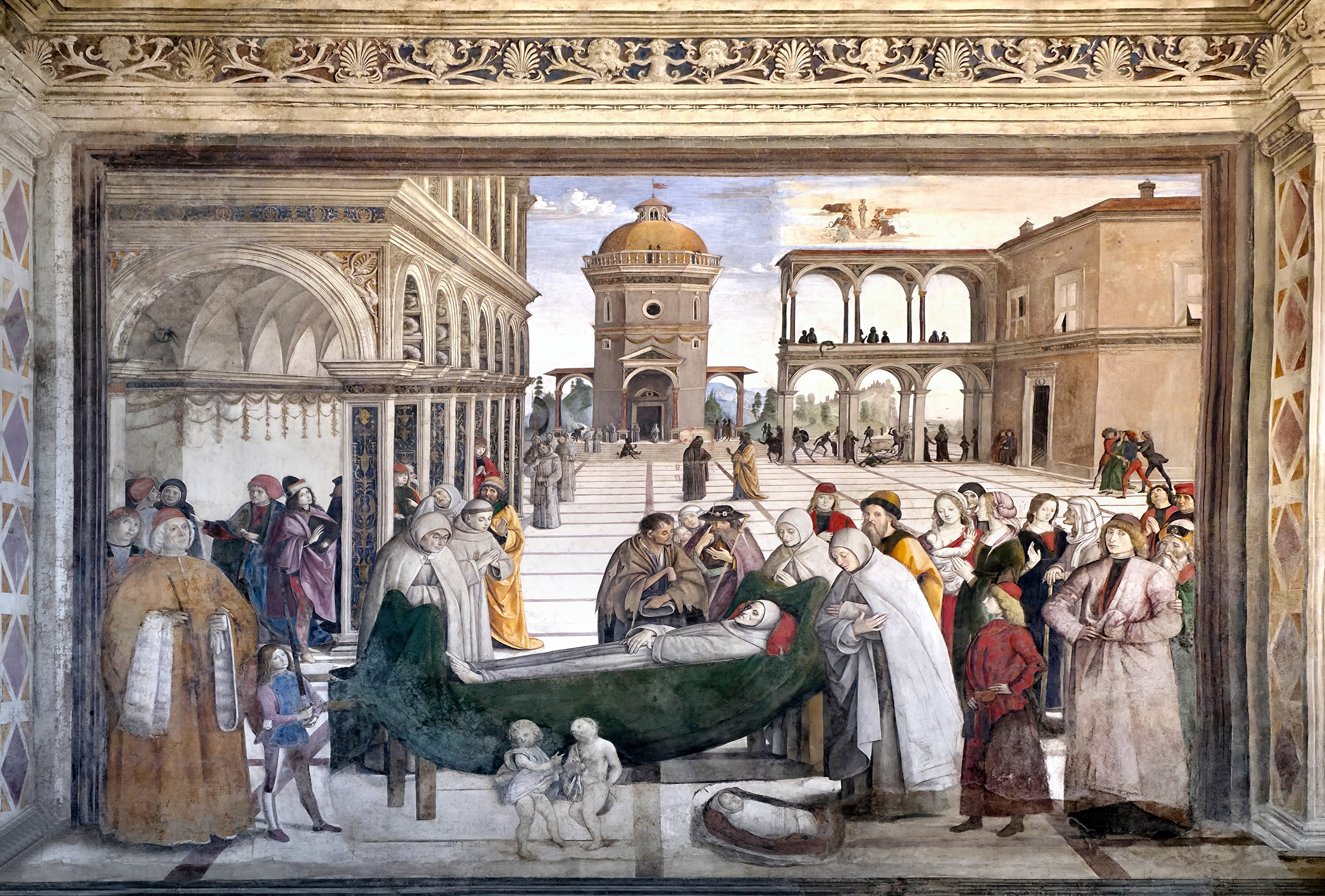
The Funerals of St. Bernardino. Riccomanno Bufalini is depicted standing on the left, next to St. Bernardino.

The foreground depicts the saints' funerals. Bernardino lies on a catafalque, which, thanks to its oblique perspective, increases the depth of the scene and the interaction between the characters. Friars, pilgrims and other common people are approaching the corpse to pay homage; on the sides are two richly dressed characters, identified as Riccomanno Bufalini (on the left, with a fur-lined hood and the gloves) and a member of his family. The remaining characters are used to portray a series of miracles attributed to Bernardino during his life: the healing of a blind man (who hints at his eyes), the resurrection of someone possessed, the healing of a dead newborn, the healing of Lorenzo di Niccolò da Prato, wounded by a bull, and the pacification of the Umbrian families.

In the fresco, Perugino's influence on Pinturicchio is manifest: the Umbrian-Perugian perspective rationality, the variety of types and attitudes of the characters, inspired by Florentine painters such as Benozzo Gozzoli or Domenico Ghirlandaio, the striking appearance of the poor pilgrims and beggars, derived from Flemish painting. The candelabra grotesque decoration is inspired by contemporary examples discovered at Rome in the Domus Aurea. These elements are contained in one of the few drawings certainly attributable to Pinturicchio, housed in the Kupferstichkabinett of Berlin (n. 5192). In his later works, the quality of Pinturicchio's decorative elements would fall due to the increasing use of assistants.
