= Miracles of Saint Bernardino =

Series of Italian paintings from 1473

Miracles of Saint Bernardino is a series of eight paintings in tempera on panel showing miracles associated with Bernardino of Siena. They date to 1473 and are now in the Galleria Nazionale dell'Umbria in Perugia.

Attributed to the Master of 1473 or the Studio of 1473, and influenced by Piero della Francesca, they were executed by several of the most notable Umbrian painters of the era such as Perugino, Pinturicchio and Piermatteo Lauro de' Manfredi da Amelia.

== History ==
In 1473 the Franciscan friars of Perugia commissioned Perugino and other artists to paint eight panels to hang above a niche holding a statue of Saint Bernardino in the town's oratory dedicated to the saint. Bernardino had only been canonised in 1450. At least five hands took part in the commission. One of the best paintings in the series is Saint Bernardino Curing a Young Girl, attributed to Perugino himself. The Miracle of the Stillborn Child is partly attributed to him. It is unknown when the series was taken down and later found rehung in the church of San Francesco al Prato in the town.

== List of works ==
1. Saint Bernardino Curing a Young Girl (Perugino)
2. Saint Bernardino Giving Sight to a Blind Man After His Death (Perugino and Pinturicchio)
3. Saint Bernardino Appearing After His Death and Freeing a Prisoner (Pinturicchio)
4. Saint Bernardino Reviving a Man Found Under a Tree on the Road to Verona (Pinturicchio)
5. Saint Bernardino Curing Nicola di Lorenzo da Prato, Attacked by a Bull
6. The Miracle of the Stillborn Child (School of Perugino)
7. Saint Bernardino Appearing at Night to Giovan Antonio Tornaro and Healing His Wound from a Trap
8. Saint Bernardino Appearing After His Death and Curing Giovanni Antonio da Parma, Injured by a Shovel
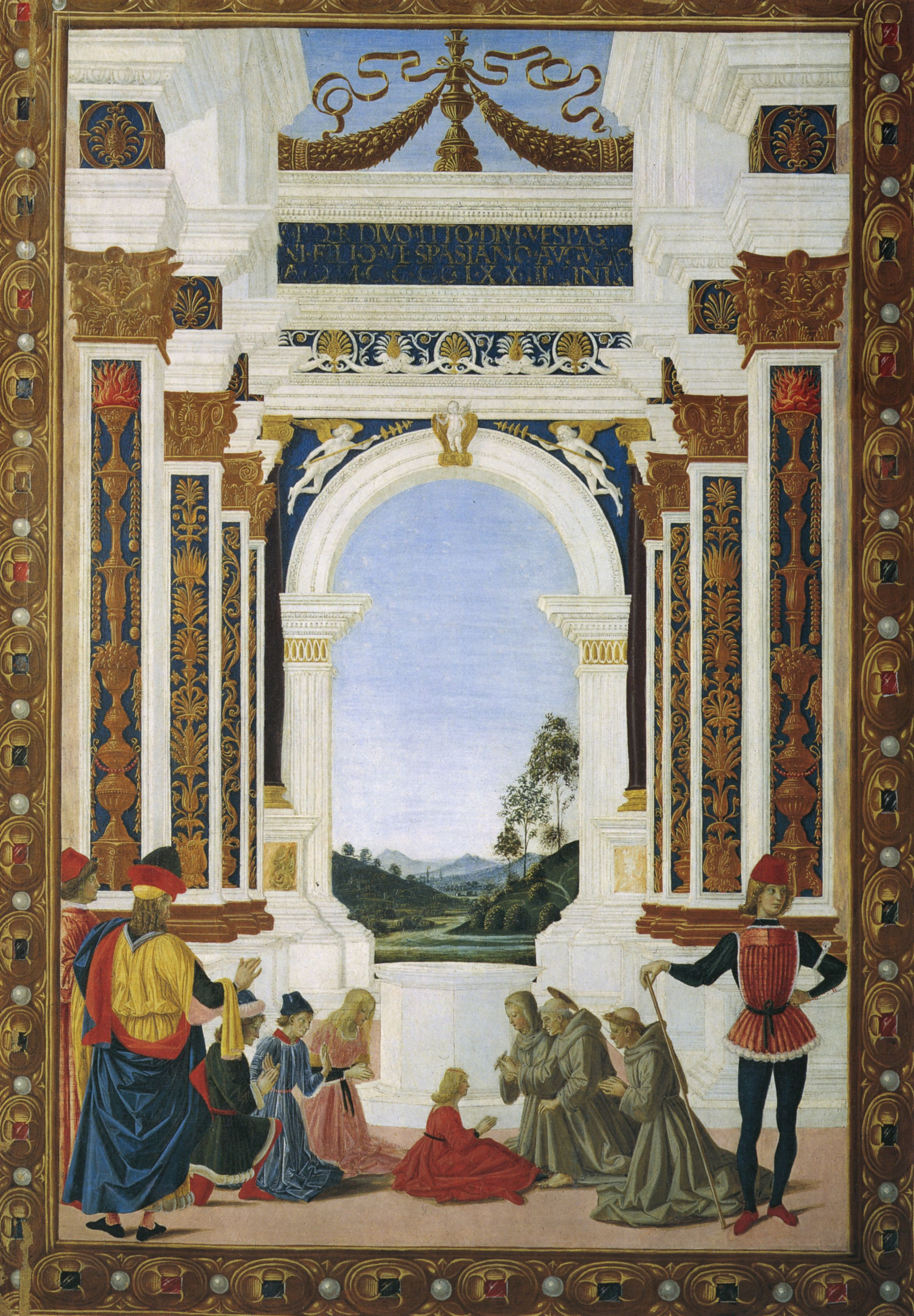
Saint Bernardino Curing a Young Girl

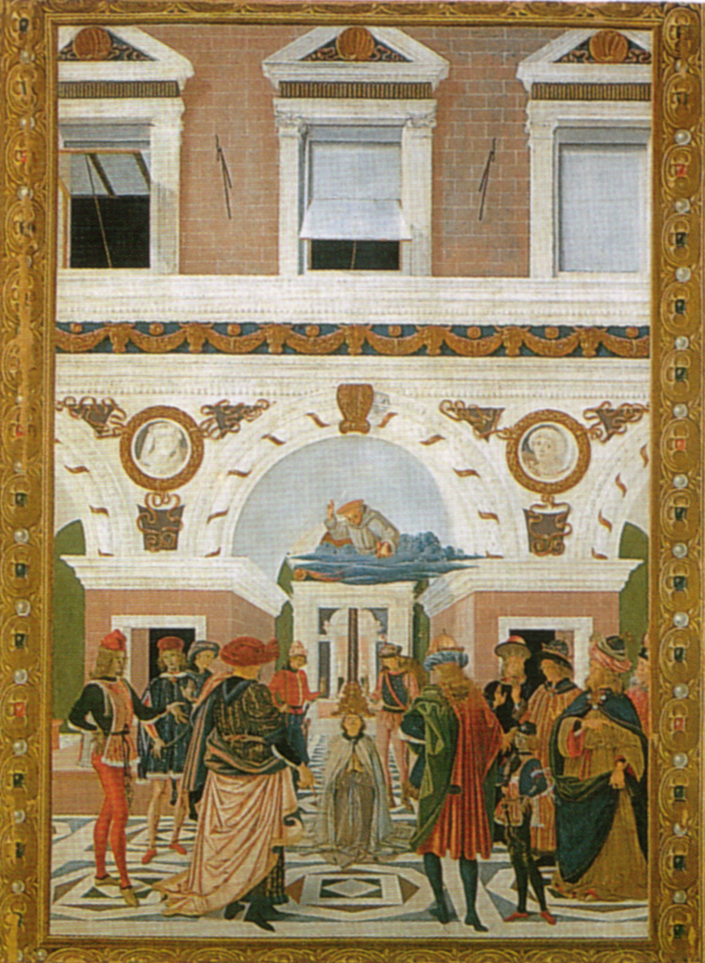
Saint Bernardino Giving Sight to a Blind Man After His Death

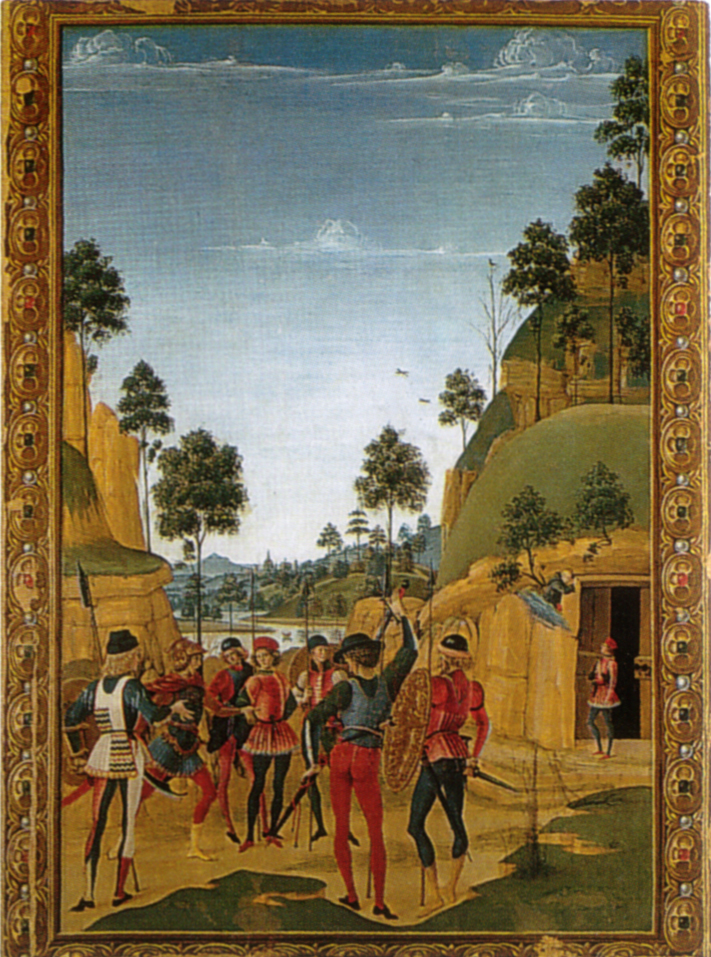
Saint Bernardino Appearing After His Death and Freeing a Prisoner

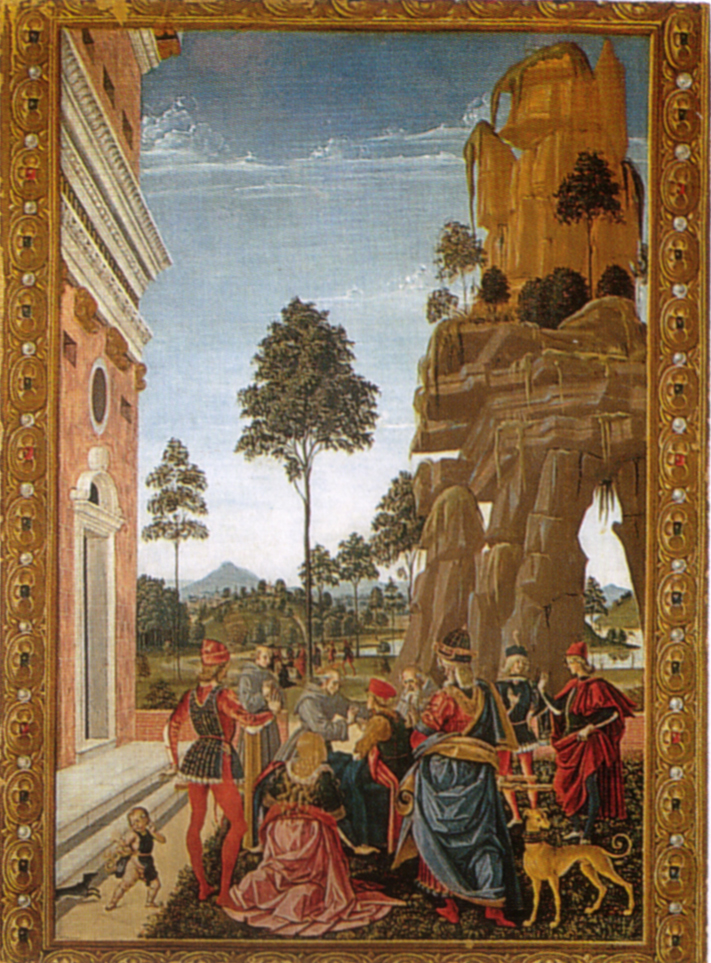
Saint Bernardino Reviving a Man Found Under a Tree on the Road to Verona
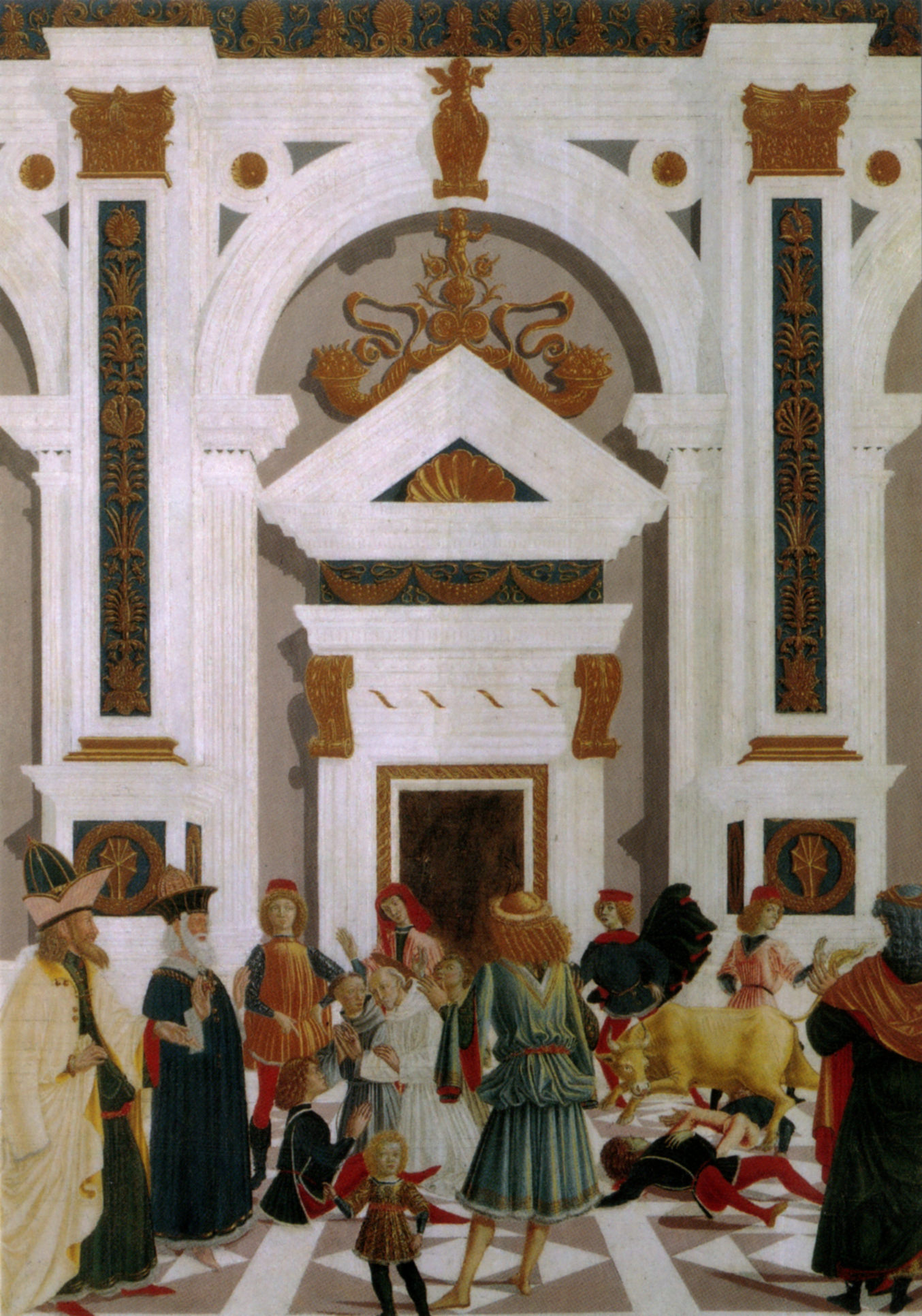
Saint Bernardino Curing Nicola di Lorenzo da Prato, Attacked by a Bull

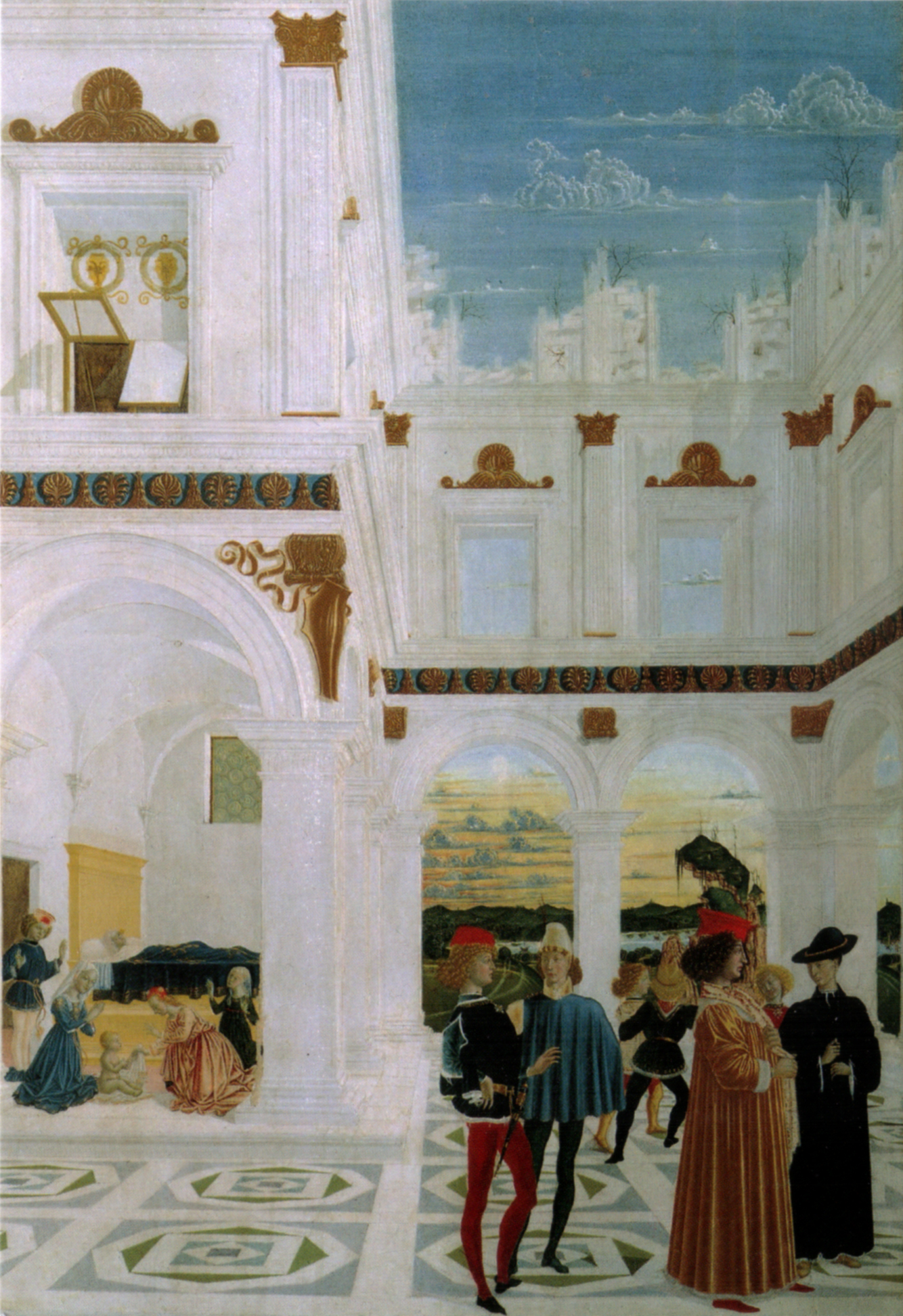
The Miracle of the Stillborn Child

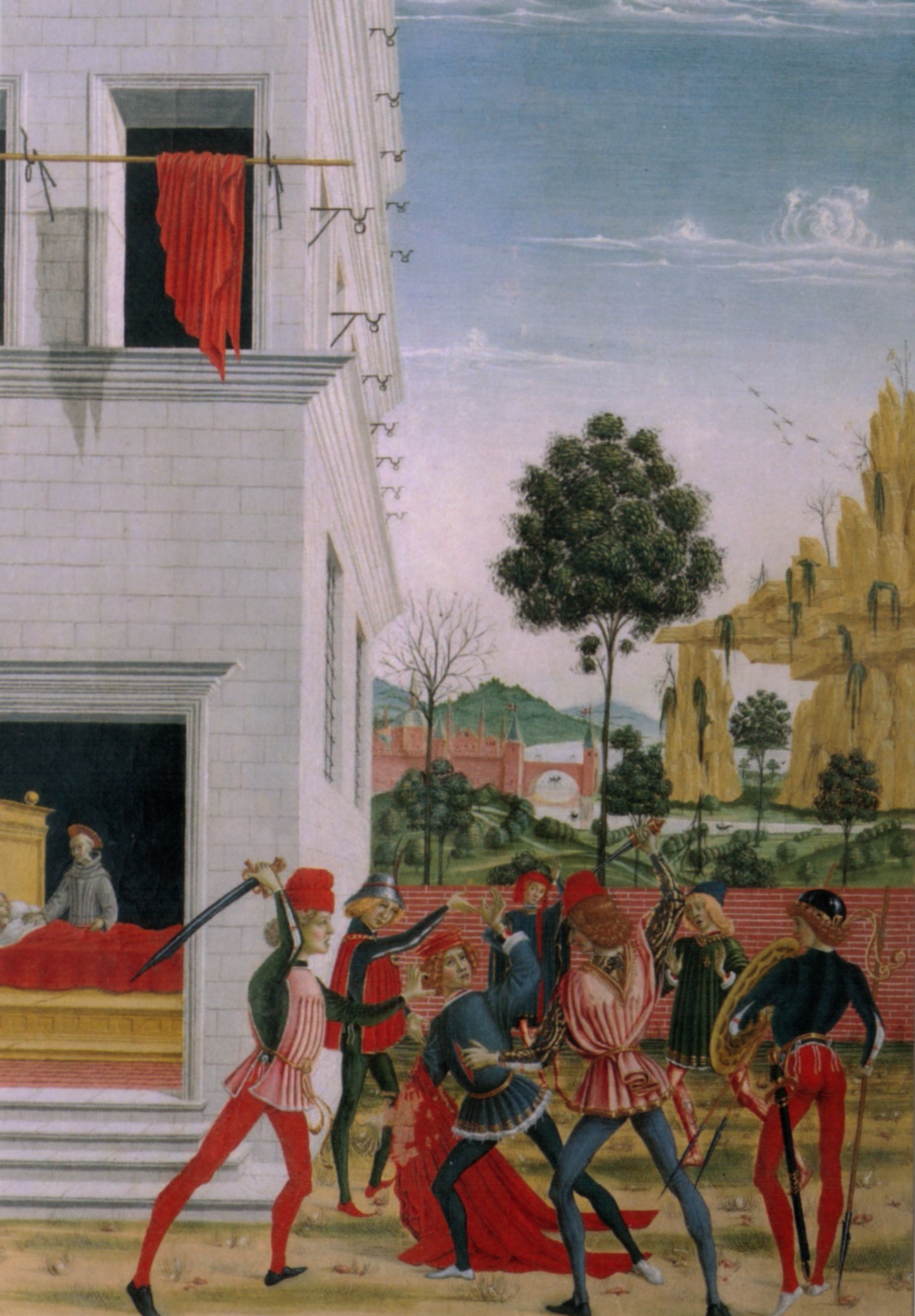
Saint Bernardino Appearing at Night to Giovan Antonio Tornaro and Healing His Wound from a Trap

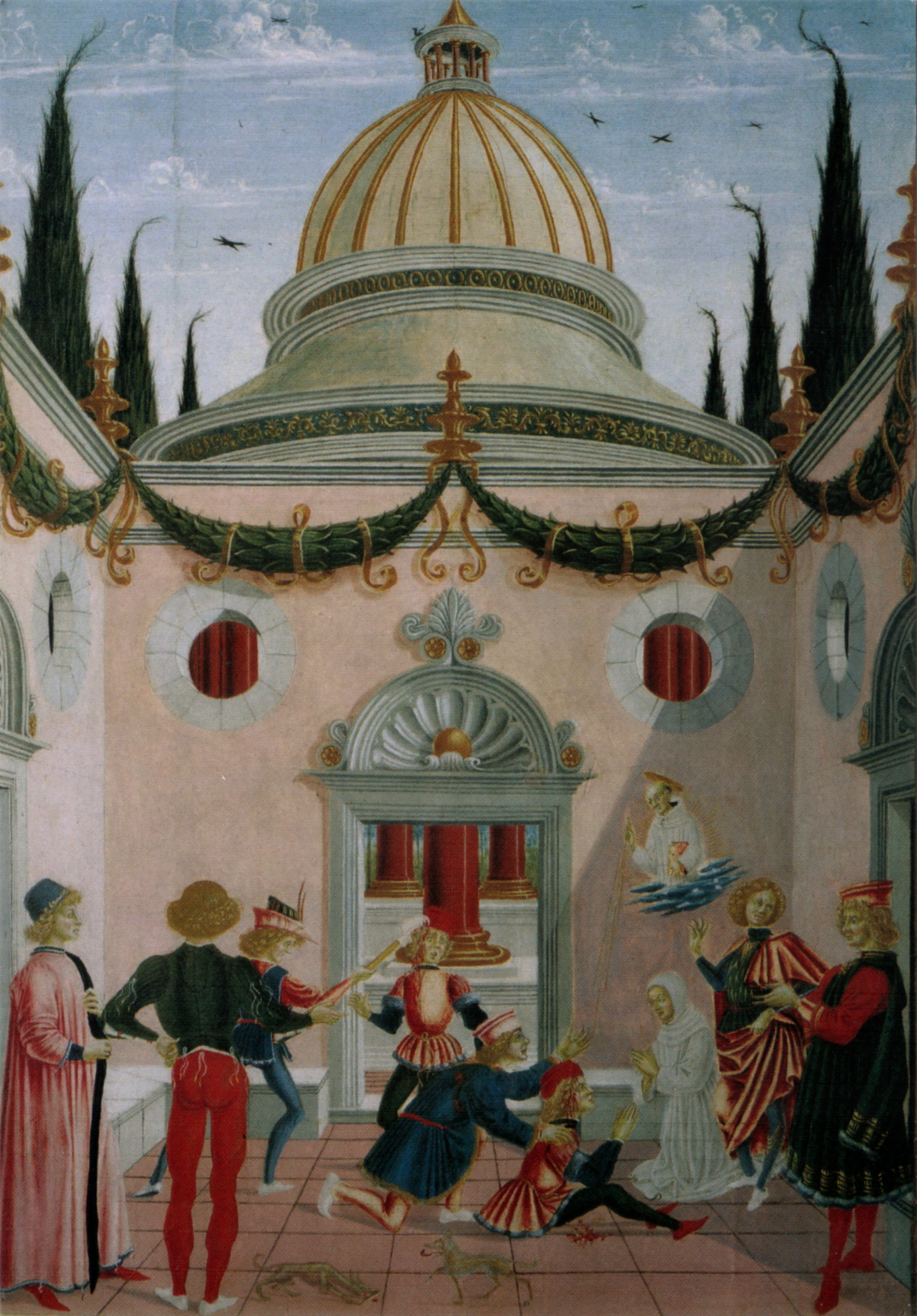
Saint Bernardino Appearing After His Death and Curing Giovanni Antonio da Parma, Injured by a Shovel

== Bibliography (in Italian) ==
- Vittoria Garibaldi, Perugino, in Pittori del Rinascimento, Scala, Florence, 2004 ISBN 888117099X
- Pierluigi De Vecchi, Elda Cerchiari, I tempi dell'arte, volume 2, Bompiani, Milan, 1999 ISBN 88-451-7212-0
- Stefano Zuffi, Il Quattrocento, Electa, Milan, 2004 ISBN 8837023154
