= Cristina Acidini =

Italian author and art historian

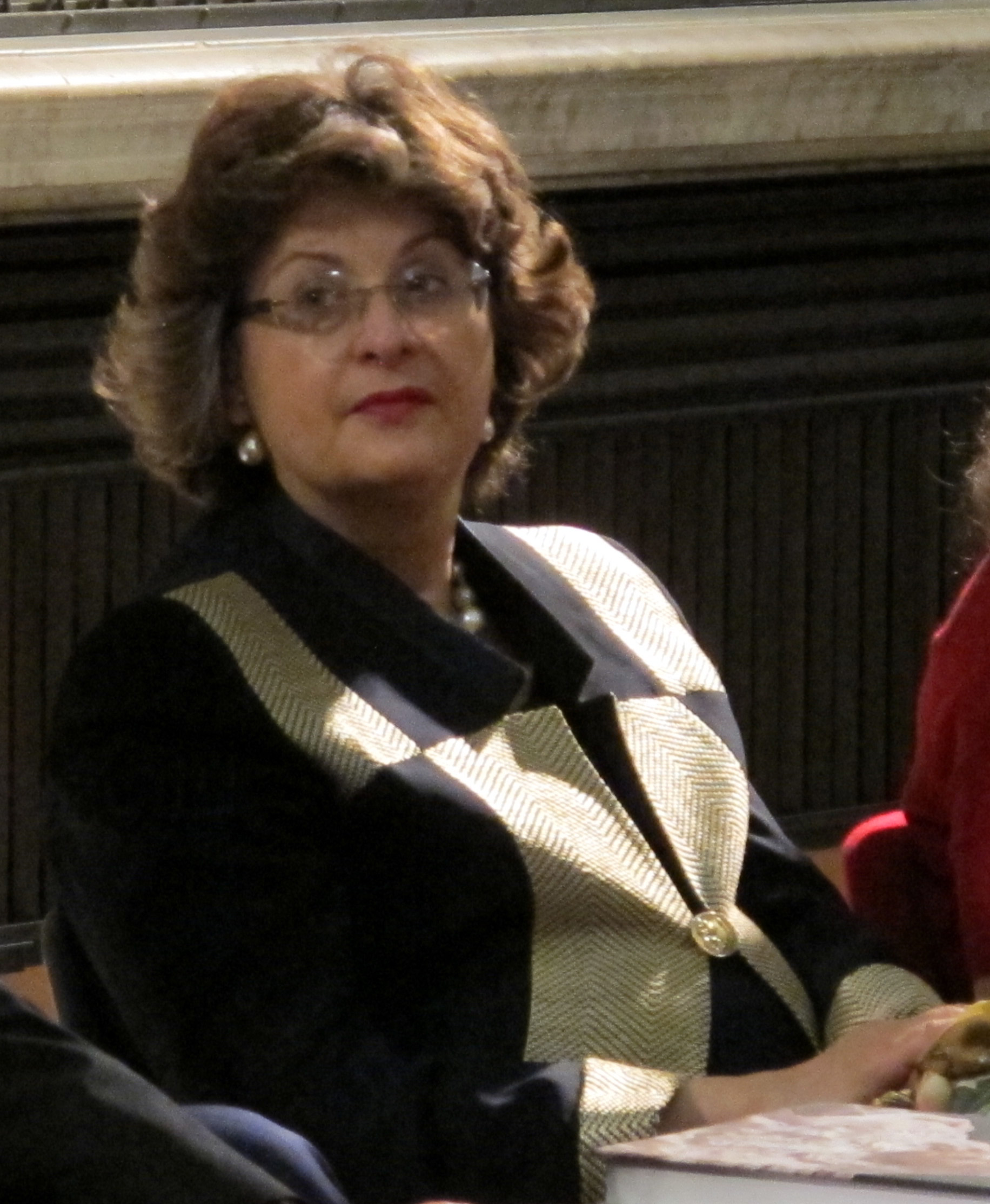
- Born: 15 May 1951 (age 75); Florence, Italy
- Education: University of Florence
- Writing career
- Pen name: Cristina Acidini Luchinat
- Genres: Art history, novel

Cristina Acidini (born 15 May 1951) is an Italian author and art historian. Her name also appears as Cristina Acidini Luchinat. She is the former Superintendent of Museum and Artistic Heritage State Board for the Florence area from 1991 to 1999.

== About ==
She was born on 15 May 1951 in Florence, Italy. She received a Bachelor of Arts degree from the University of Florence in 1977.

In 1991, she was visiting professor at State University of New York at Plattsburgh. In 1997, she received an Eisenhower Fellowship and visited more than 70 museums in the United States; she published a book Il Museo d'arte americano dietro le quinte di un mito on the subject in 1999. From 2000 to 2008, she was director of the Opificio delle pietre dure. Acidini has been a senior officer in the Italian Ministry for Art and Culture and was deputy superintendent of the Museum and Artistic Heritage State Board for the Florence area from 1991 to 1999. She has been president of the Accademia delle Arti del Disegno.

Acidini has written many essays on the history of art and has published two novels.

In 2008, she received an award from the Foundation for Italian Art and Culture, a non-profit organization based in New York City. She has been awarded the "Beata Beatrix" prize in Pescara, the Associazione Imprenditrici e Donne Dirigenti d'Azienda (AIDDA) award, an award from the National Museum of Women in the Arts and the Premio Il Bel San Giovanni. She was named a Commander in the Order of Merit of the Italian Republic, a Chevalier in the French Ordre des Arts et des Lettres and a member of the scientific council of the Museo di Storia Naturale di Firenze. She has also received the Premio Firenze Donna, the Salimbeni Prize and the Nelli Award of the Advancing Women Artists Foundation. In 2013 Acidini was awarded the Premio Galileo for her contributions to culture.

Acidini was one of the experts who attributed the Crocifisso Gallino to Michelangelo. After the work was purchased by Italy, she was sued for negligence in 2012 but was later found not liable.

== Career ==
Although not directly involved in the 1966 Florence flood rescue efforts, Acidini has contributed to the interpretation and presentation of its cultural impact. In 2016, she co-curated Firenze 1966–2016. La bellezza salvata, an exhibition marking the 50th anniversary of the flood, which presented restored artworks and objects affected by the disaster.

Beyond her work on the flood’s legacy, Acidini has held leadership positions in Florence’s major cultural institutions, including President of the Accademia delle Arti del Disegno and Chairman of the Opera di Santa Croce.

== Personal life ==
She married Claudio Luchinat in 1977.
