= Crucifixion (disambiguation) =

Crucifixion is an ancient method of execution.

Crucifixion, Crucify or Crucified may also refer to:

- Crucifixion of Jesus

== Music ==
- "Crucifixion" (song), by Phil Ochs, 1966
- "Crucifixion" or "He Never Said a Mumblin' Word", a spiritual song
- "The Crucifixion" (Stainer), an 1887 Passion oratorio by John Stainer
- "The Crucifixion", a song from the 1971 album musical Jesus Christ Superstar by Andrew Lloyd Webber and Tim Rice
- "Crucify" (song), by Tori Amos, 1992
- "Crucified" (Army of Lovers song), 1991
- "Crucified" (Bella & Filippa song), 2017
- "Crucified", a song by Sevendust from the 2001 album Animosity
- "Crucified", a song by Accept from the 1996 album Predator
- "Crucified", a song by Disturbed from the 2010 album Asylum
- "Crucified", a song by Julian Lennon from the 1998 album Photograph Smile
- "Crucified", a song by Venom from the 2015 album From the Very Depths
- "Crucified", a song by Eighteen Visions from the 2017 album XVIII

== Paintings ==
- Crucifixion (Antonello da Messina), three different 15th-century paintings
- Crucifixion (Bellini), c. 1455–1460
- Crucifixion (Francis Bacon, 1933)
- Crucifixion (Francis Bacon, 1965)
- Crucifixion (Bramantino), c. 1510–1512
- The Crucifixion (Cranach), 1532
- Crucifixion (Corpus Hypercubus), by Salvador Dalí, 1954
- Cruxifiction, part of the Doña María de Aragón Altarpiece by El Greco, 1596–1599
- The Crucifixion (Gérôme), or Jerusalem , 1867
- Crucifixion (Heemskerck), 1543
- Crucifixion (Nabil Kanso), 1983
- Crucifixion (Mantegna), 1457–1459
- Crucifixion, part of the 1426 Pisa Altarpiece by Masaccio
- Crucifixion (Barnaba da Modena), 1375
- The Crucifixion (Pavias), 15th-century
- Crucifixion (Perugino and Signorelli), c. 1483–1495
- Crucifixion (Tintoretto), 1565
- Crucifixion (Titian), 1558 painting
- Crucifixion (Uccello), c. 1457–1458
- Crucifixion Diptych (van der Weyden), 1460s
- Crucifixion Triptych, by Rogier van der Weyden, c. 1443–1445
- Crucifixion (van Dyck), 1630
- Crucifixion (van Eyck), a 15th-century drawing
- Crucifixion (after van Eyck?), c. 1440–50
- Crucifixion (Vouet), 1636–1627

== Other uses ==
- The Crucifixion (film), a 2017 horror film

== See also ==
- Christ Crucified (disambiguation)
- The Crucified, an American Christian band
- Crucifixion in the arts
- Crucifixion Altarpiece, by Melchior Broederlam and Jacques de Baerze, 1390s
- Crucifixion Between Saints Jerome and Christopher, a 1480s painting by Pinturicchio
- Crucifixion with a Donor, a 1480s painting by Hieronymus Bosch
- Crucifixion with Pietà (Lotto), a 1530 painting
- Crucifixion with Saint Mary Magdalene (disambiguation)
- Crucifixion with Saints (Annibale Carracci), 1583
- Crucifixion with the Virgin and St John, by Hendrick ter Brugghen, c. 1625
- Crucifixion with the Virgin, Saint John and Saint Mary Magdalene, by Anthony van Dyck, 1617–1619
- Crucifixion with Two Angels, by Paolo Uccello, c. 1423
- Pazzi Crucifixion, by Perugino, c. 1495
- What Our Lord Saw from the Cross, a c. 1890 watercolor painting by James Tissot
