= Crucifixion with Saint Mary Magdalene =

Crucifixion with Saint Mary Magdalene may refer to:

- The Crucifixion with Saint Mary Magdalene (Signorelli), by Luca Signorelli
- The Pazzi Crucifixion, by Pietro Perugino

== See also ==
- Crucifixion with the Virgin, Saint John and Saint Mary Magdalene by Peter Paul Rubens
