= Decemviri Altarpiece =

Painting by Pietro Perugino

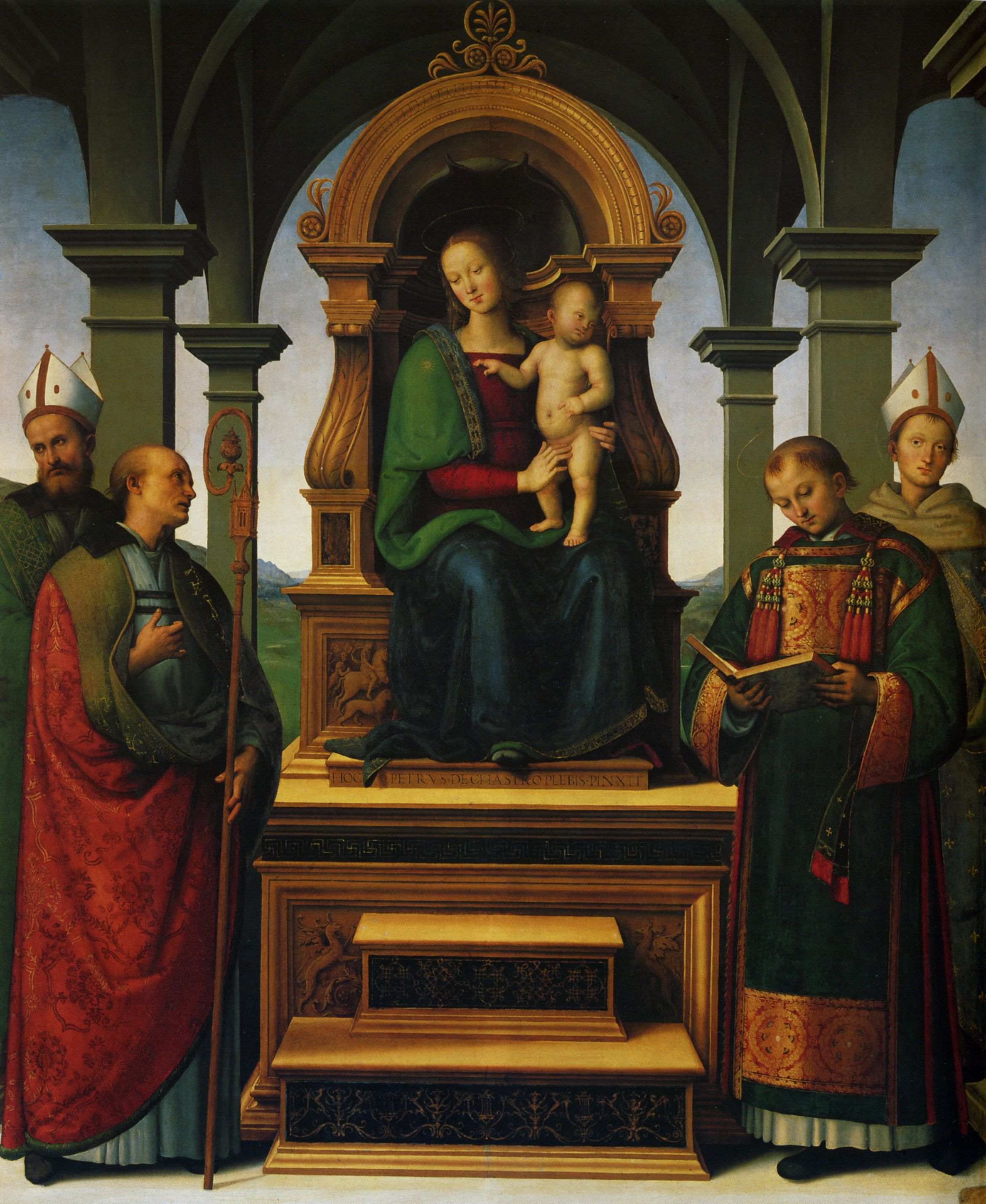
- Artist: Pietro Perugino
- Year: 1495–1496
- Medium: Oil on panel
- Dimensions: 193 cm × 165 cm (76 in × 65 in)
- Location: Pinacoteca Vaticana, Rome

Decemviri Altarpiece (Italian: Pala dei Decemviri) is a painting by the Italian Renaissance artist Pietro Perugino, executed in 1495–1496, and housed in the Pinacoteca Vaticana in Vatican City.

The work was commissioned by the Decemviri ("Ten Men") of Perugia for the chapel in the Palazzo dei Priori, and was executed 1495 to 1496. It was originally surmounted by a Pietà (87 × 90 cm), now at the Galleria Nazionale dell'Umbria.

== Description ==
The work portrays the Virgin on a high throne, with decorations and reliefs. Behind her is a bright landscape with hills. She holds the child in a position identical to that in the Fano Altarpiece. At her sides are Saint Lawrence, Louis of Toulouse, Herculanus and Constantius of Perugia.

The portico theme was typical of Perugino's late 15th-century works, such as the Albani Torlonia Polyptych and the Pietà.

== Sources ==
- Garibaldi, Vittoria (2004). "Perugino". Pittori del Rinascimento (in Italian). Florence: Scala.
