= Annunciation of Fano =

Painting by Pietro Perugino

- Artist: Pietro Perugino
- Year: c. 1488–1490
- Medium: Oil on panel
- Dimensions: 212 cm × 172 cm (83 in × 68 in)
- Location: Church of Santa Maria Nuova, Fano

Annunciation of Fano is a painting by the Italian Renaissance artist Pietro Perugino, executed around 1488–1490, and housed in the church of Santa Maria Nuova, Fano, Italy.

The work was successful, and a few years later he was commissioned to paint an altarpiece for the same church, the Fano Altarpiece.

== Description ==
The painting is set within a four bay portico, a common element in Perugino's paintings from the 1480s (as, for example, in the Albani-Torlonia Polyptych and the Pietà). Behind it is a background with hills featuring light trees.

In the foreground is the Annunciation, lit from the left. The angel, holding a white lily (symbol of purity), announces that she will bear Jesus; Mary, who was previously reading a book on a classical altar in front of her, has a surprised face. Behind them, in the upper center, is God in an oval with cherubim and seraphim, sending the Holy Spirit (portrayed as a dove) to her.

== Sources ==
- Garibaldi, Vittoria (2004). "Perugino". Pittori del Rinascimento (in Italian). Florence: Scala.
