= Crucifixion (Perugino and Signorelli) =

Painting by Luca Signorelli

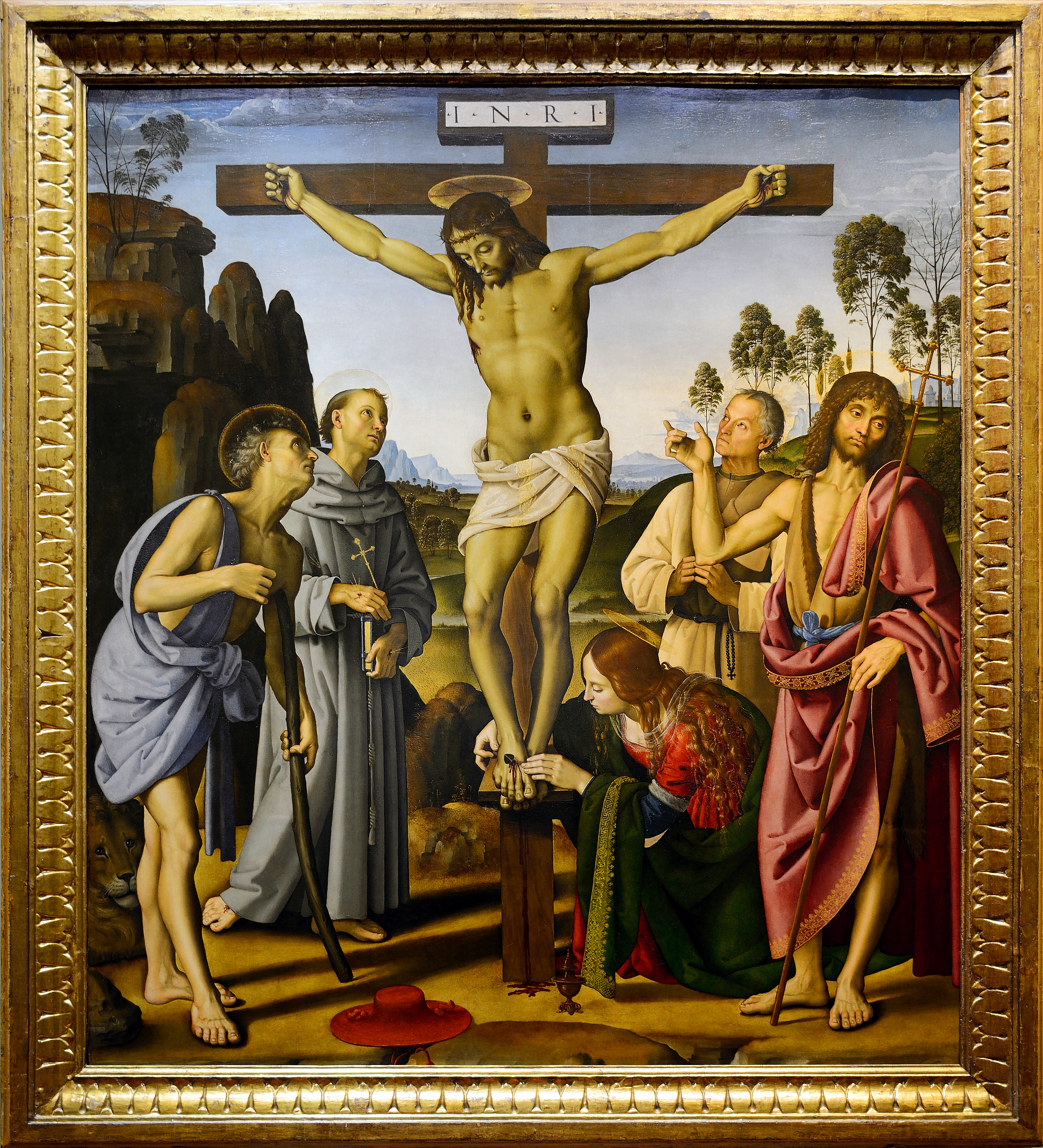
- Artist: Perugino and Signorelli
- Year: c. 1483–1495
- Medium: oil on panel
- Dimensions: 203 cm × 180 cm (80 in × 71 in)
- Location: Uffizi, Florence

Crucifixion is a painting of the Crucifixion of Christ, usually attributed to Perugino, with or without assistance from Luca Signorelli. The work's dating and attribution are both uncertain - Venturi and Schmarsow attribute it to a pupil of Perugino, whilst other art historians attribute it to Perugino alone or with assistance from Signorelli. The deep chiaroscuro is comparable to Signorelli's style elsewhere or to the early style of Perugino whilst he was still heavily influenced by Verrochio. The landscape background is typical of Perugino, with mountains and hills in deep perspective.

It is usually dated to between 1470 and 1478 or to between 1480 and 1490 - if it is the latter, it was one of three paintings produced for the church of the Jesuati monastery of San Giusto alle mura in Florence - the other two are Pietà and Agony in the Garden. To the left of the cross stand saint Jerome (inspiration for the Jesuati) and Francis of Assisi. To its right are Mary Magdalene touching Christ's feet, Blessed Giovanni Colombini (founder of the Jesuati) and John the Baptist (patron saint of Florence). John points to Christ, whilst Jerome has thrown down his cardinal's cap at the foot of the cross, symbolising his rejection of earthly honours

Giorgio Vasari saw all three paintings in their original positions over the church's side altars, but after the church was destroyed in the 1529 Siege of Florence all three paintings were moved to the order's new monastery of San Giovanni Battista della Calza near the city's Porta Romana. After that monastery was suppressed the Crucifixion passed through several different hands before being bought by its current owner the Uffizi in 1904 for 30,000 lira.

== Bibliography ==
- (in Italian) Vittoria Garibaldi, Perugino, in Pittori del Rinascimento, Scala, Florence, 2004 ISBN 888117099X
- (in Italian) Pierluigi De Vecchi, Elda Cerchiari, I tempi dell'arte, volume 2, Bompiani, Milan, 1999 ISBN 88-451-7212-0
