= Madonna and Child Enthroned with Saints John the Baptist and Sebastian =

Painting by Pietro Perugino

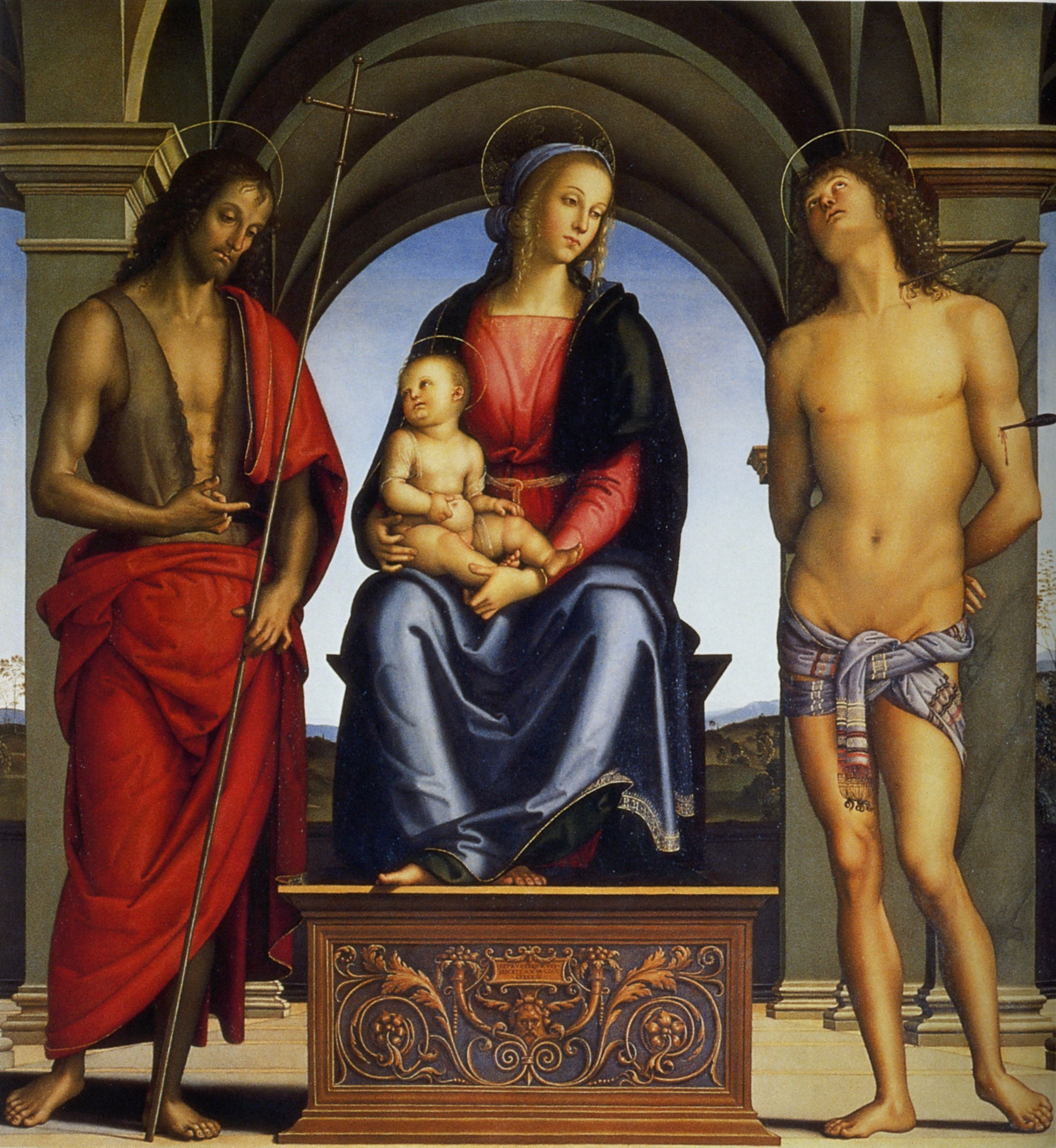
- Artist: Pietro Perugino
- Year: 1493
- Medium: Oil on panel
- Dimensions: 178 cm × 164 cm (70 in × 65 in)
- Location: Uffizi Gallery, Florence

The Madonna and Child Enthroned with Saints John the Baptist and Sebastian is a painting by the Italian Renaissance artist Pietro Perugino, executed in 1493 and housed in the Uffizi Gallery, Florence.

== History ==
The work was commissioned by Cornelia Salviati, widow of the Venetian merchant Giovanni Martini, and his son Roberto, for the chapel of the convent of San Domenico, Fiesole, which had been perhaps restored by Giuliano da Sangallo a few years before. In 1493 Perugino had married Chiara Fancelli, daughter of the architect Luca Fancelli; the face of the Madonna is a portrait of her.

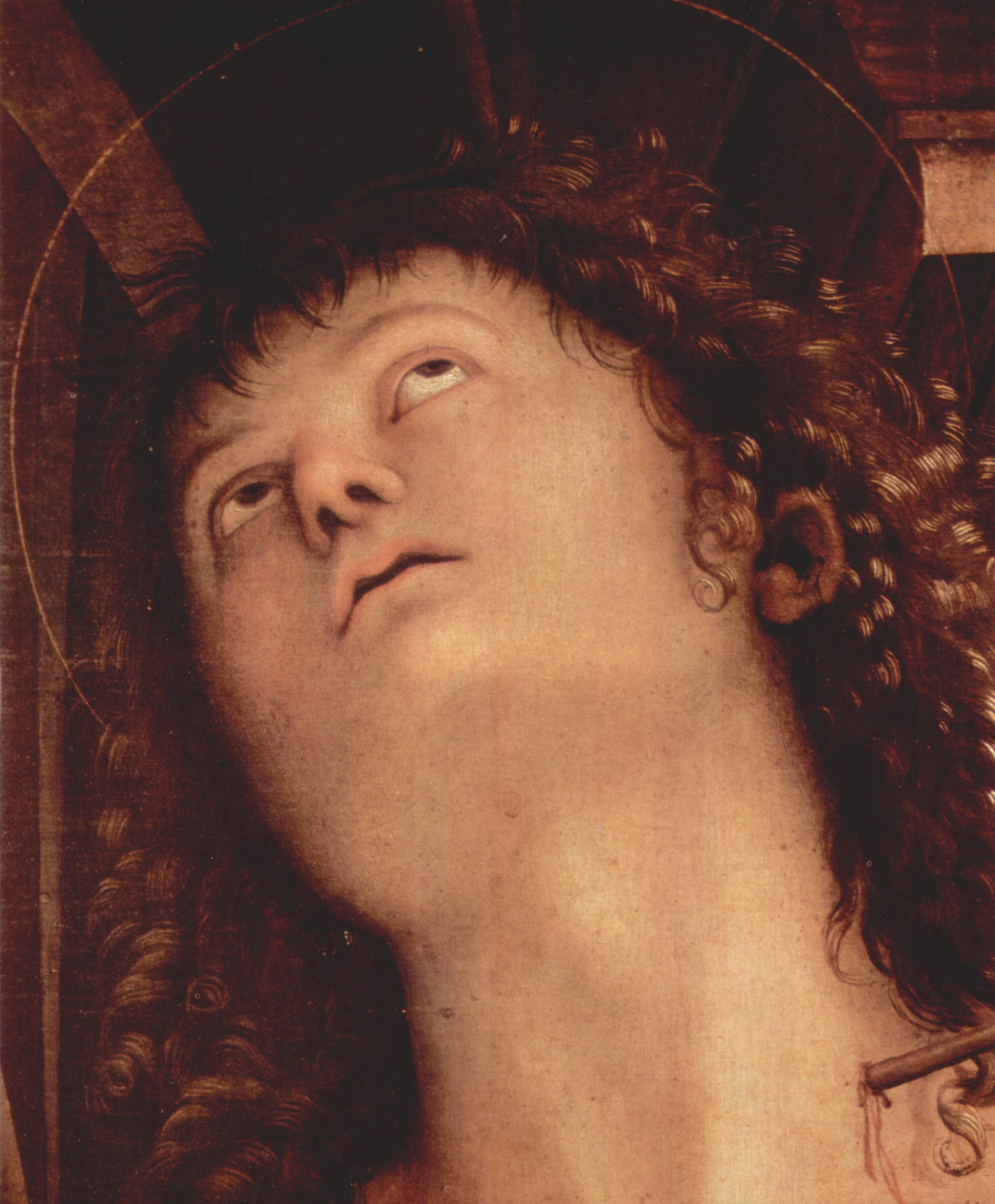
Detail of Saint Sebastian's face.

In 1786 the panel was acquired for 1000 scudi by Peter Leopold, Grand Duke of Tuscany, becoming part of the future Uffizi Gallery. The original chapel was redecorated by a painting by Lorenzo di Credi; the one now in the church is a copy by Garibaldo Ceccarelli.

It was restored in 1995.

== Description ==
The background, this time featuring two bays, is one of the many porticoes painted by Perugino in the 1480s and 1490s, in works such as the Fano Altarpiece or the Pietà. Also typical is the serene landscape with thin trees.

The Virgin sits on a high throne decorated with grotesques at the base, which also includes the signature PETRVS PERVSINVS PINXIT AN[NO] MCCCCLXXXXIII ('Pietro Perugino painted it, 1493'). She holds the Christ Child on her knees, as he looks towards John the Baptist on the left; John, in turn, points at him. On the right is the common representation of Saint Sebastian martyred by arrows, his contemplative gaze directed to the heavens.

The composition was one of the first examples in Florence of the new style of sacra conversazione elaborated in Venice by Antonello da Messina and Giovanni Bellini a few years before, with a pyramidal development pivoting on the central figure of the Virgin on a high throne. The painting is also one of the first by Perugino in which the Madonna is no longer an elegant maid, but a more mature and severe woman, according to the more sober climate introduced in Florence by Girolamo Savonarola. Another example of this evolution is the Madonna and Child with Saint Catherine of Alexandria in the Kunsthistorisches Museum, Vienna.

== Sources ==
- Garibaldi, Vittoria (2004). "Perugino". Pittori del Rinascimento (in Italian). Florence: Scala.
