= Agony in the Garden (Perugino) =

Painting by Pietro Perugino

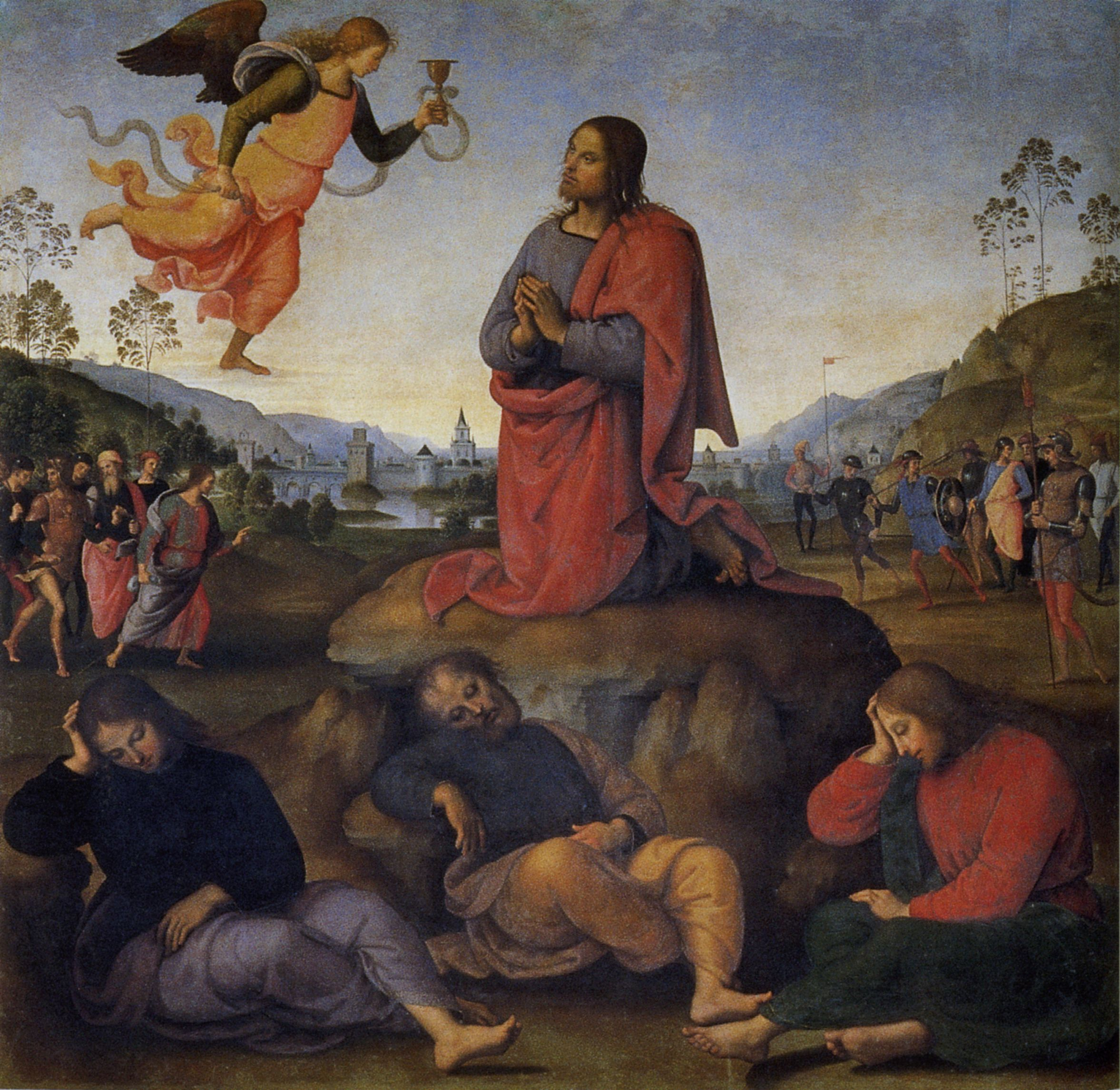
- Artist: Pietro Perugino
- Year: c. 1483–1493
- Medium: Oil on panel
- Dimensions: 166 cm × 171 cm (65 in × 67 in)
- Location: Uffizi Gallery, Florence

Agony in the Garden is a painting by the Italian Renaissance artist Pietro Perugino, executed around 1483–1493, and housed in the Uffizi Gallery, Florence.

== History ==
The work was painted for the church of the convent of San Giusto alle mura together with the Pietà and a Crucifixion. Renaissance art biographer Giorgio Vasari saw them in side altars of the church of San Giovanni Battista alla Calza, after the original location had been destroyed during the Siege of Florence in 1529. It was moved to the Uffizi in the 20th century.

The dating of the work is disputed: it varies from 1482, the year of Perugino's return from Rome, to a slightly later period, although before the end of the century, when the artist started to use only line oil, which in these works is used only at an experimental level.

The painting was restored in 1998.

== Description ==
Christ is portrayed in center of the panel above a clear sky, kneeling in the Garden of Gethsemane and receiving by an angel a divine chalice. His figure forms a triangle with the three sleeping apostles at the bottom (from the left, John, Peter and James); the triangle is connected to the painting's sides by the symmetrical line of the hills. Behind Jesus is a lake landscape, a typical element of the Italian painting at the time, with a fortified city and an ancient bridge.

At the sides, two groups of soldiers, led by Judas Iscariot, are closing to arrest Jesus.

== Sources ==
- Garibaldi, Vittoria (2004). "Perugino". Pittori del Rinascimento (in Italian). Florence: Scala.
