= Crucifixion (van Dyck) =

Painting by Anthony van Dyck

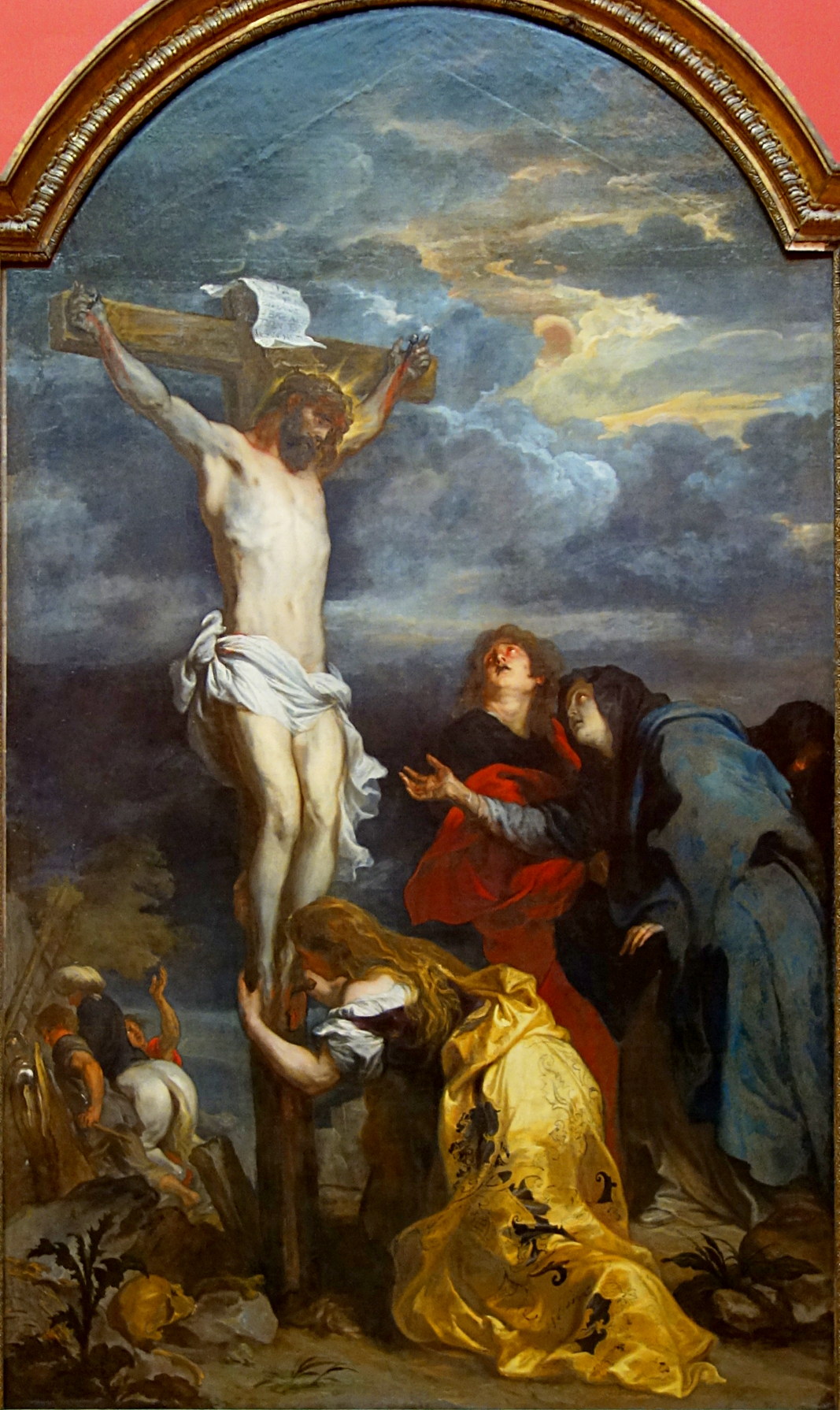
Crucifixion (c. 1630) by Anthony van Dyck

The Crucifixion is an oil on canvas painting by Anthony van Dyck, produced c. 1630. It is 2.51 m high.

== History ==
It was originally commissioned as the high altar-piece in the convent of the Récollets in Lille during van Dyck's second Antwerp period, between his return from Italy in 1627 and his departure for London in 1632. It returned to a theme he had already painted around 1617–19 during his first Antwerp period, when he was still a studio-assistant to Rubens – this was the Crucifixion with the Virgin, Saint John and Saint Mary Magdalene, sold to Rubens in 1621 as the high altarpiece for the Jesuit church at the abbaye Saint-Winnoq in Bergues, now in the Louvre. The second work's composition is more original, with a less central cross in an oblique position to give depth to the scene. The sky and the Magdalene's hair show the influence of the Venetian masters van Dyck had seen during his time in Italy.

It was seized during the French Revolution and in 1795 it was part of the founding collection of the Palais des beaux-arts de Lille, where it still resides.

== Iconography ==
The three colours worn by the three mourners are symbolic: golden yellow by Mary Magdalene (eternal light), red by John the Evangelist (the Passion) and blue by the Virgin Mary (the mantle of humanity). The third shadowed figure to the far right is unclear, but may be one of the Three Marys. The crucifixion occurred at Golgotha ("the place of the skull") and so Adam's skull is shown at the foot of the cross, to the lower left, under a thistle, symbolising the misfortune of the Fall and Original Sin, its spines invoking Christ's crown of thorns. In the semi-circle above the cross is a 'mystic delta' symbolising the Holy Trinity.

== See also ==
- List of paintings by Anthony van Dyck
