= Fano Altarpiece =

1497 painting by Pietro Perugino

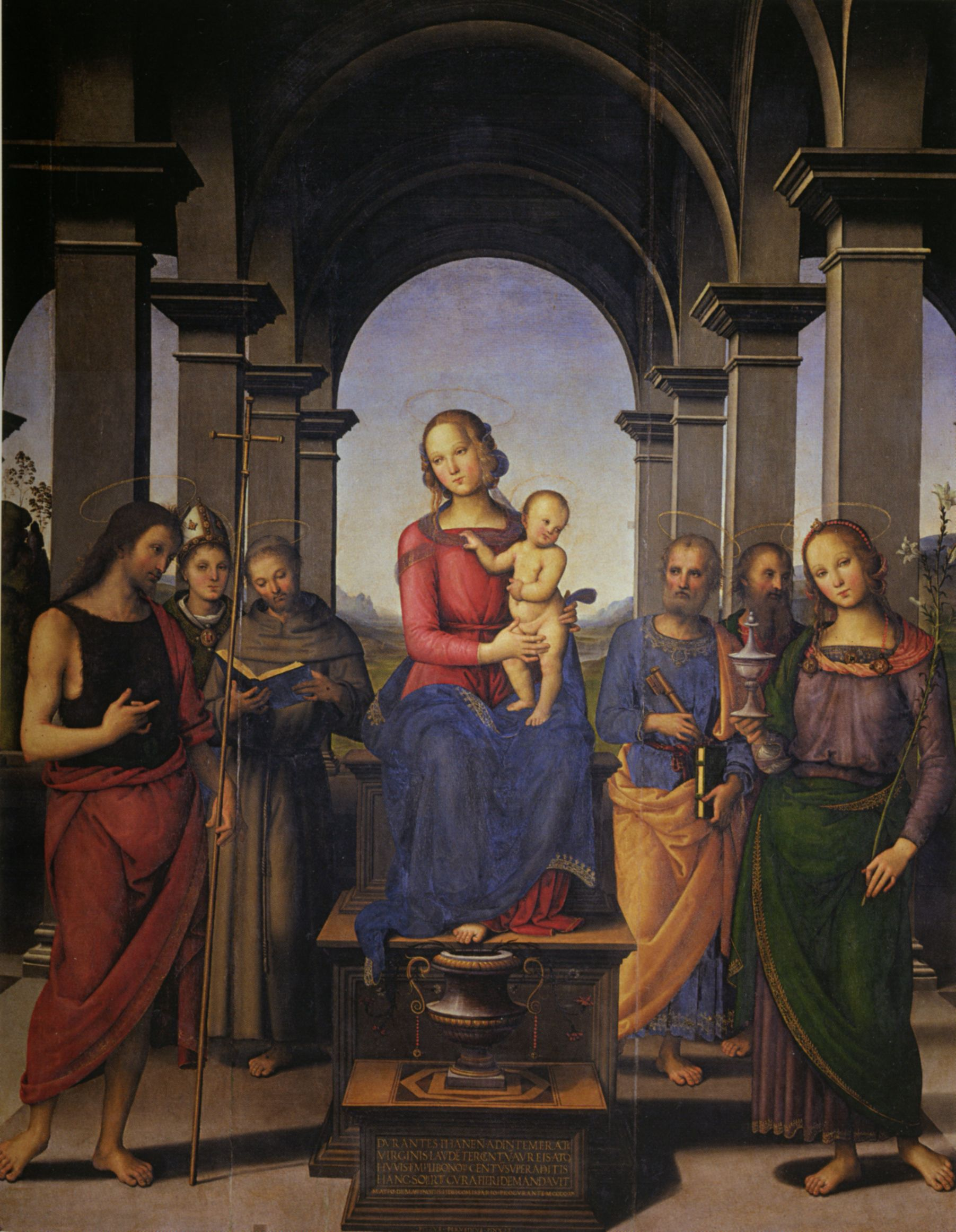
- Artist: Pietro Perugino
- Year: 1497
- Medium: Oil on panel
- Dimensions: 262 cm × 215 cm (103 in × 85 in)
- Location: Church of Santa Maria Nuova, Fano

The Fano Altarpiece is a painting by the Italian Renaissance artist Pietro Perugino, executed in 1497, and housed in the church of Santa Maria Nuova, Fano, central Italy. It also includes a lunette with a Pietà and several predella panels.

Perugino had already painted an Annunciation in 1488–1490. Several scholars have supposed that a young Raphael collaborated on the predella.

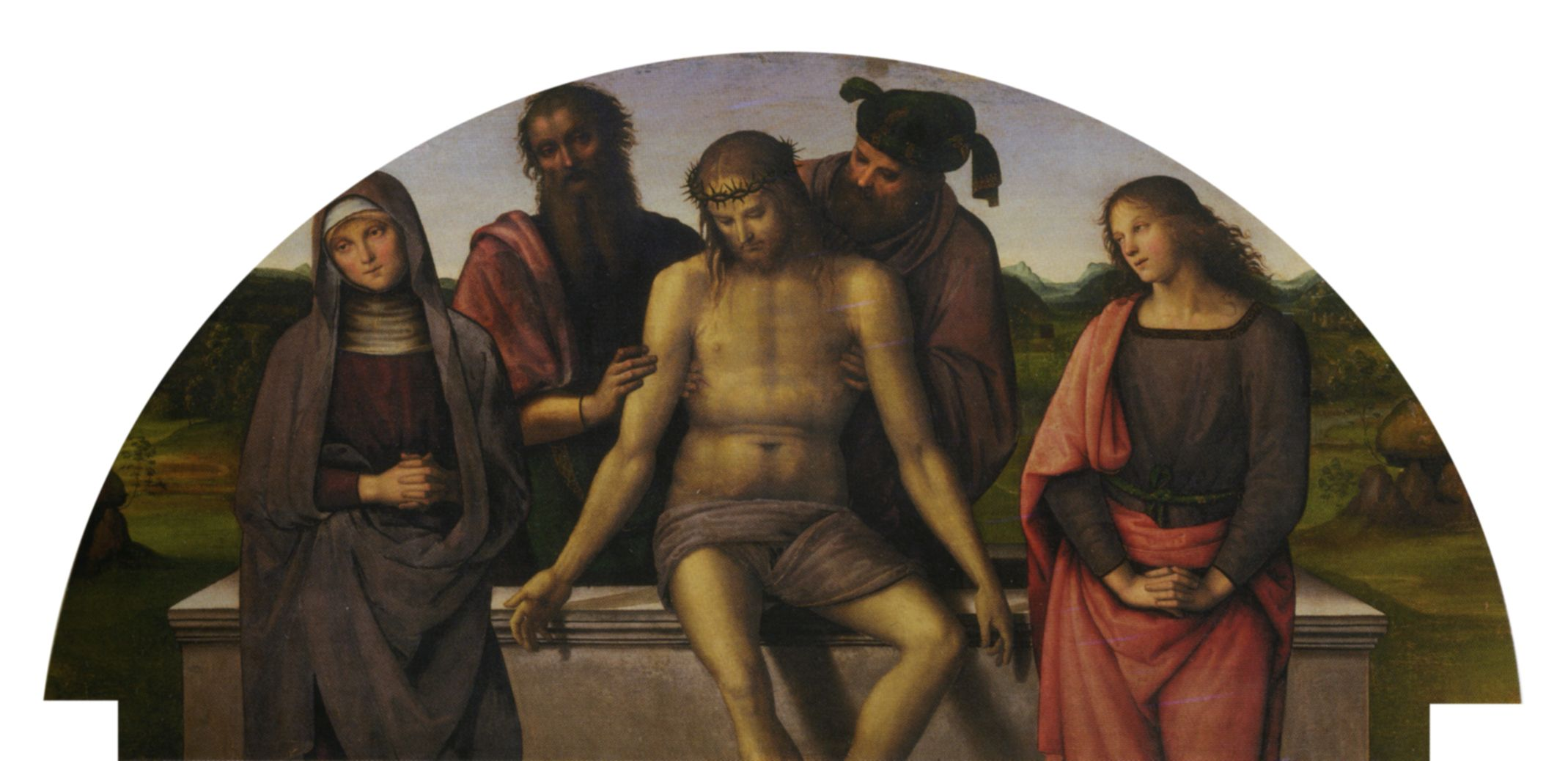
Lunette.

== Description ==
The Madonna is portrayed on a luminous landscape of hills, on a high throne; in front of her is a pedestal with, on it, a mystic vase, and featuring the signature and date, which were always added by Perugino when the painting was produced in his workshop and then shipped to the destination. Mary holds the Child in the same fashion of the Decemviri Altarpiece of 1495–1496.

At the sides are the saints John the Baptist (with a camel skin and a stick with the cross), Louis of Toulouse, who wears a bishop dress, Francis of Assisi (reading), Peter with the Keys of Heaven, Paul (with a long beard and a red vest) and Mary Magdalene with offerings to the Madonna. The portico is a typical element of Perugino's paintings of the period, such as the Albani Torlonia Polyptych; also typical of his late works is the Madonna's figure as a more mature woman, different than the elegantly youthful portrayal painted before. Less usual are the differentiated proportions of the saints and of the Madonna herself.

The lunette depicts Jesus raised from his sepulchre by Joseph of Arimathea and Nicodemus, with Mary and John the Apostle at the sides. The predella includes the scenes of the Nativity of Mary, the Presentation of Jesus at the Temple, the Marriage of the Virgin, the Annunciation and the Assumption. In these secondary paintings, Perugino used some of his typical themes, including the portico and the oval in a valley.

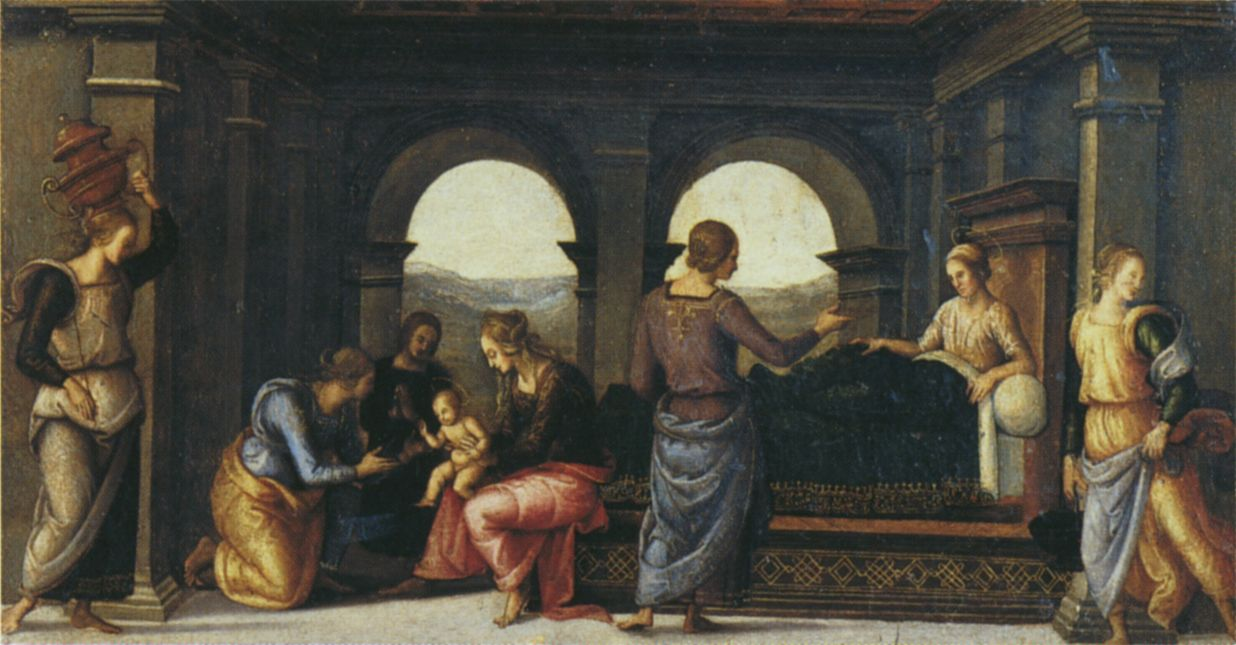
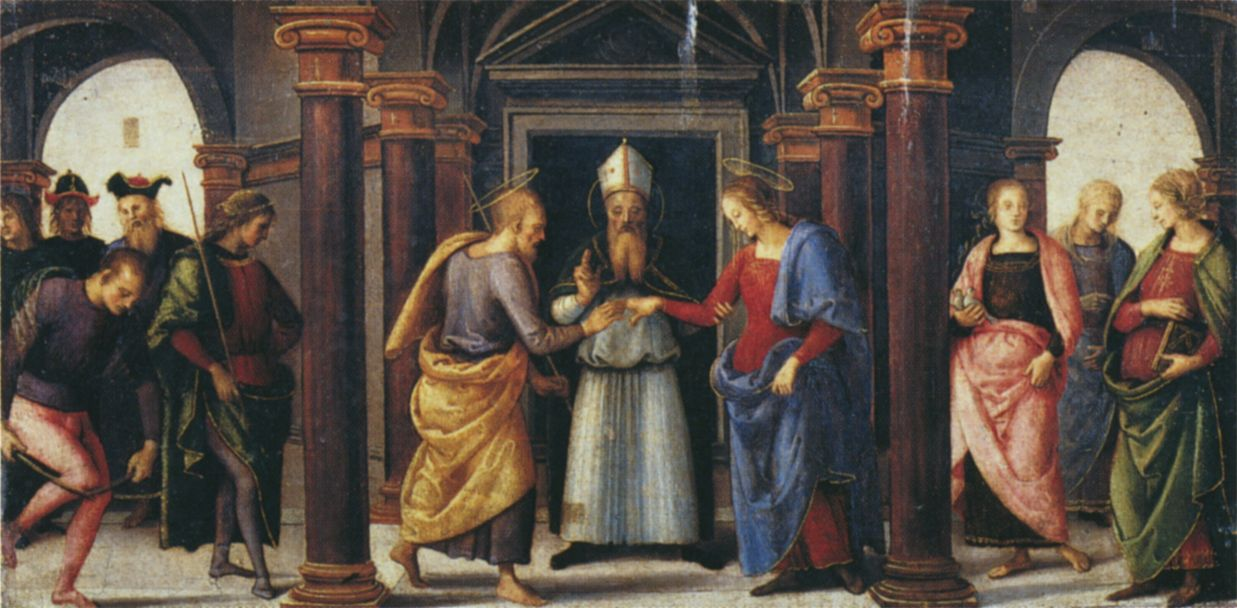
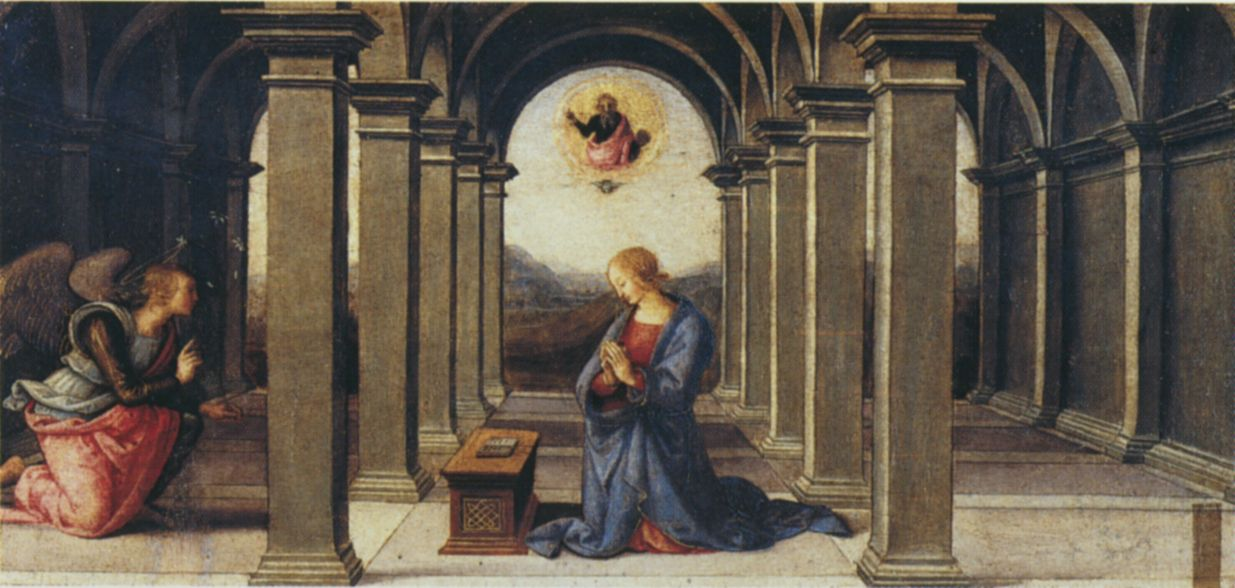
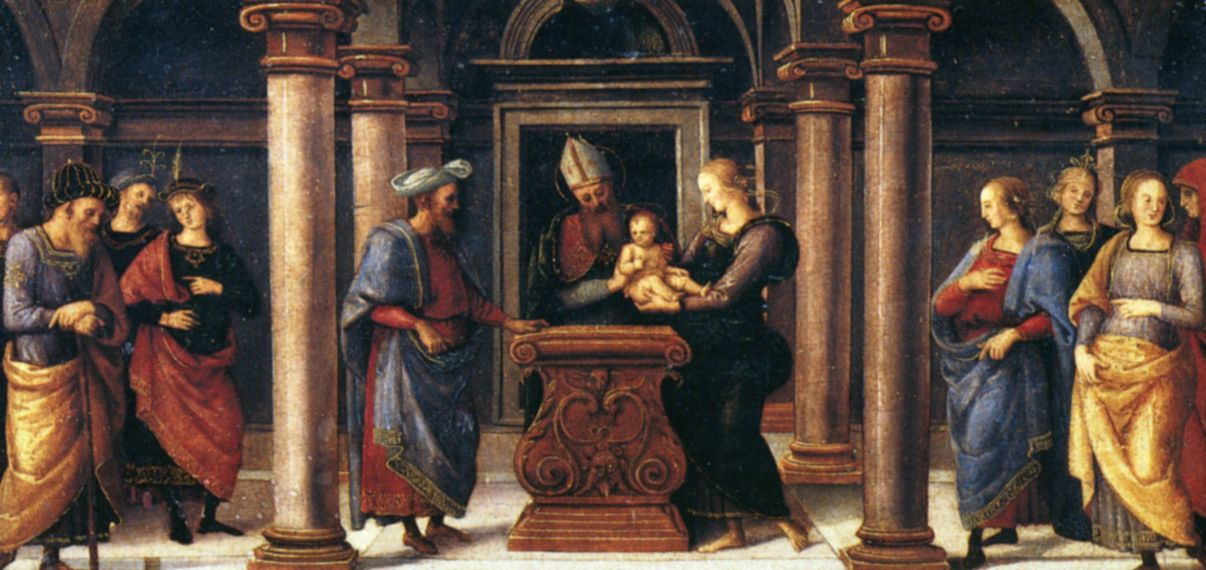
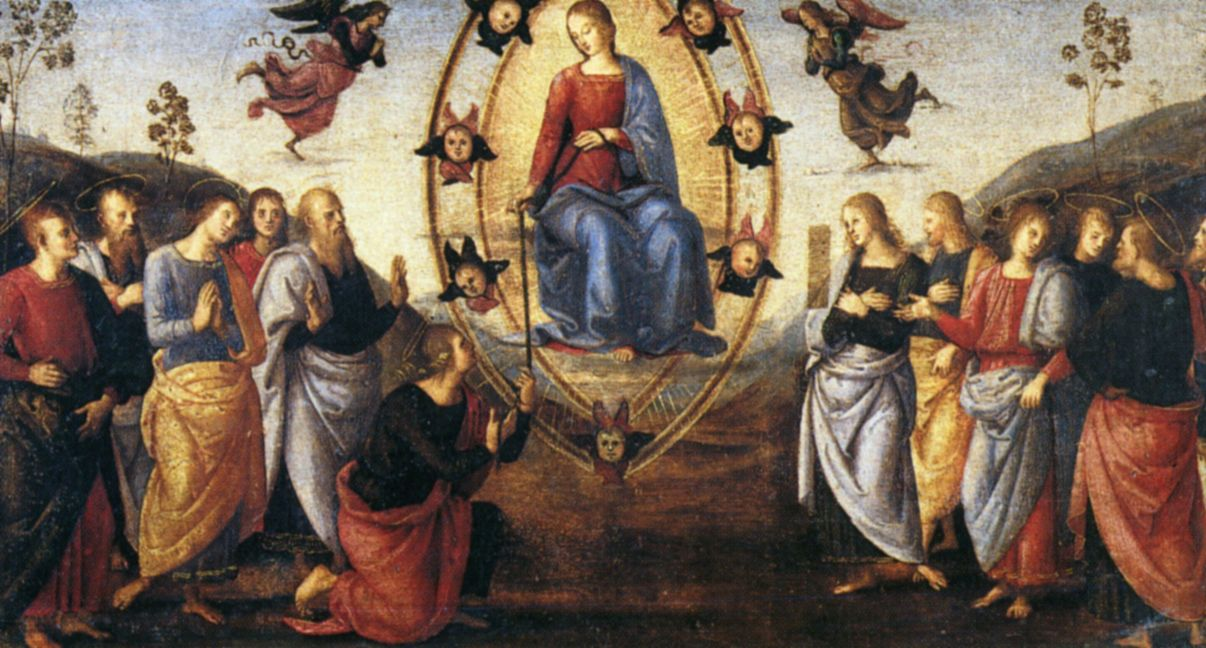

Predella.

== Sources ==
- Garibaldi, Vittoria (2004). "Perugino". Pittori del Rinascimento (in Italian). Florence: Scala.
