= Christ Crucified =

Christ Crucified may refer to:

- Crucifixion of Jesus
- Christ Crucified (Goya), a 1780 painting by Francisco de Goya
- Christ Crucified (Velázquez), a 1632 painting by Diego Velázquez
- American Gospel: Christ Crucified, a 2019 American documentary film

== See also ==
- Crucifixion (disambiguation)
