= Crucifixion with Saint Mary Magdalene (Signorelli) =

Painting by Luca Signorelli

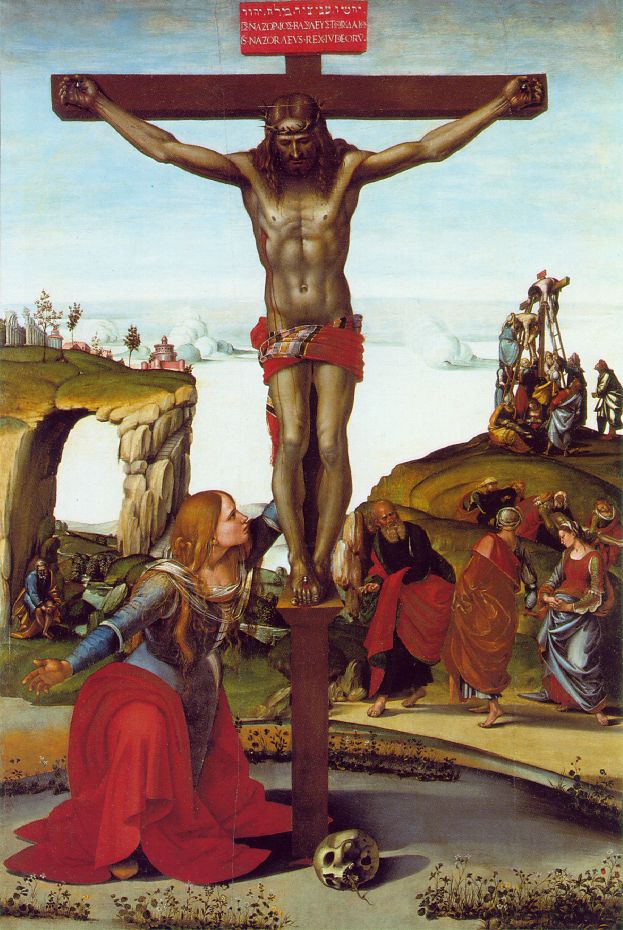
- Artist: Luca Signorelli
- Year: c. 1502–1505
- Medium: Oil on canvas
- Dimensions: 247 cm × 165 cm (97 in × 65 in)
- Location: Uffizi; Florence

The Crucifixion with Saint Mary Magdalene is a c. 1502–1505 painting in tempera on canvas by Luca Signorelli, now in the Uffizi in Florence. It is usually held to be a late autograph work.

== History ==
The Crucifixion with Saint Mary Magdalene was first listed in the catalogue of Florence's Galleria dell'Accademia, where all the works of art seized from the city's suppressed monasteries and convents were brought in the late 18th and early 19th centuries. Cavalcaselle and the catalogue by Masselli initially attributed it to Andrea del Castagno, until in 1879 Vischer argued it was an autograph work by Signorelli. In 1889, Cruttwell attributed it to a studio assistant of Signorelli; Adolfo Venturi agreed with Cruttwell, but Bernard Berenson, Mario Salmi, and Moriondo agreed with Vischer.

A 1953 restoration found a drawing of Saint Jerome on the back of the work, identified using traditional iconography; the drawing had been covered by a second layer of canvas support.

== Description and style ==
On a background of a scenic, almost visionary, landscape, with rocky spurs and a sea with cresting waves, the crucified Christ is silhouetted, dark, and monumental. Christ is displayed in a rigidly frontal position, with the signs of the Passion clearly visible (e.g., the dripping blood). At his feet, Mary Magdalene kneels with her arms outstretched in a gesture of desperation, even if her face appears calm. At the cross's base, a skull with a serpent serves as a memento mori.

In the background, at different distances (not always connected well), there are related scenes: the repentance of Peter, the deposition from the Cross with a pyramidal composition, and the transportation of the body of Christ. At left, there is a city full of classical monuments and ruins, including the Castel Sant'Angelo on the edge of a cliff.

The small flowers in the foreground pay tribute to Flemish art and to Leonardo da Vinci's scientific naturalism.
