= Crucifixion (Barnaba da Modena) =

Panel painting

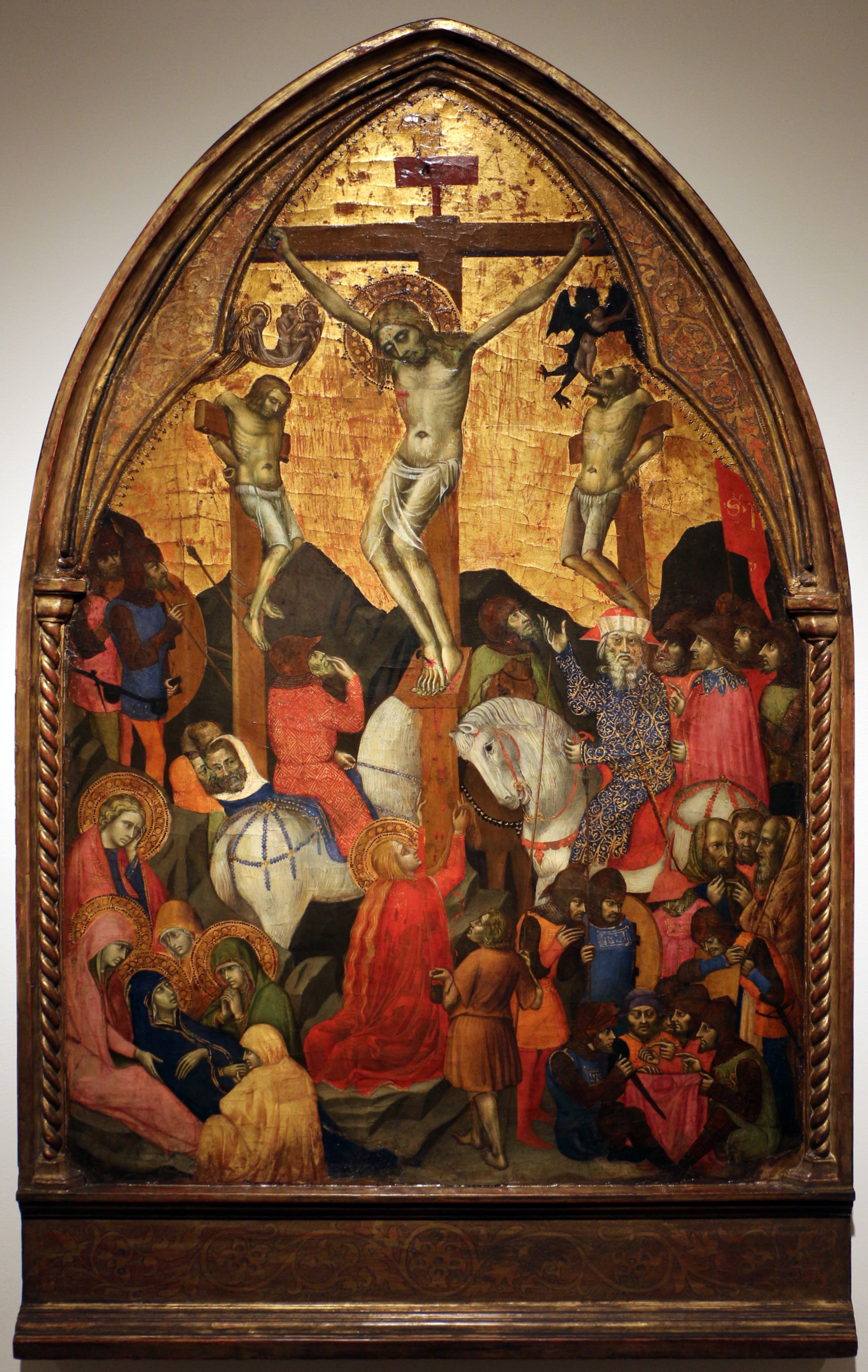
- Artist: Barnaba da Modena
- Year: 1375
- Type: Tempera and gold on panel
- Dimensions: 100 cm × 67 cm (41 in × 26.5 in)
- Location: Indianapolis Museum of Art; Indianapolis

Crucifixion is a 1375 panel painting by Italian artist Barnaba da Modena, located in the Indianapolis Museum of Art, which is in Indianapolis, Indiana. It depicts the crucifixion of Jesus in tempera and gold.

== Description ==
There is a distinct division in this image between the celestial upper half and the heavy, earthbound lower half. The upper section is serene, with a gold background enveloping Jesus, the good thief (whose soul is being borne up to Heaven), and the bad thief (whose soul is being torn out by demons). The bottom part of the panel, however, is crammed full of figures and narratives. A swooning Mary is supported by attendants, including John. Mary Magdalene and a boy to quench Jesus' thirst with vinegar stand at the foot of the cross. To the right, soldiers gamble for the clothes of the condemned. Just above them rides Pontius Pilate. His banner is emblazoned with S.P.Q.R., standing for Rome, while above Jesus' head is the mocking I.N.R.I. This clash of old and new in their respective standards reiterates the divided nature of the painting.

Although Modena used a conservative style, his figures are highly expressive. His ability to create such lively, emotive figures made him the foremost painter in late fourteenth century Genoa.

=== Acquisition ===
The IMA acquired Crucifixion in 1924, courtesy of the James E. Roberts Fund. It has the accession number 24.5.

== See also ==
- Crucifixion in the arts
