= Pietà (Perugino) =

Painting by Pietro Perugino

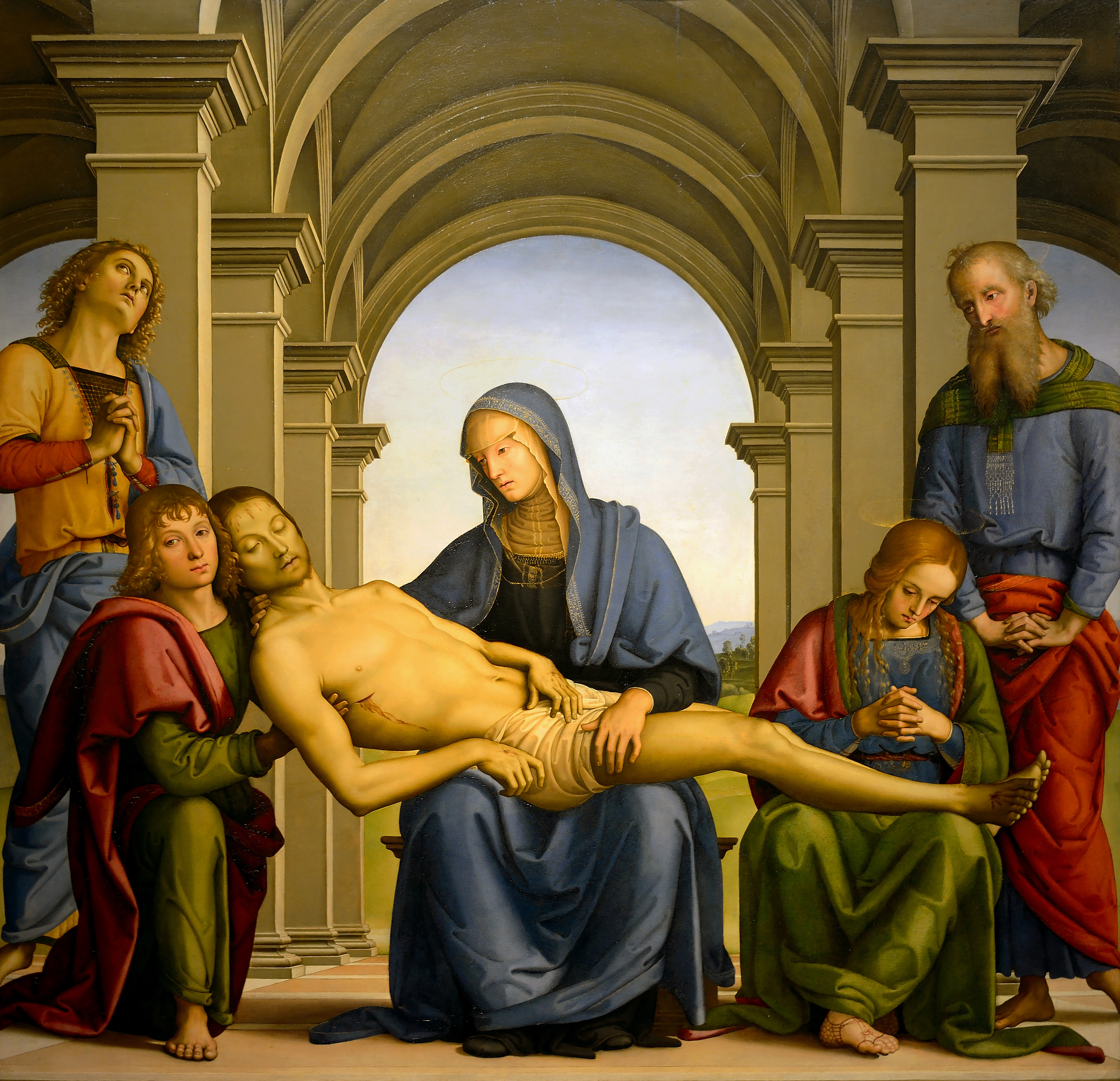
- Artist: Pietro Perugino
- Year: c. 1483–1493
- Medium: Oil on panel
- Dimensions: 168 cm × 176 cm (66 in × 69 in)
- Location: Uffizi Gallery, Florence

Pietà is a painting by the Italian Renaissance artist Pietro Perugino, executed around 1483–1493, and housed in the Uffizi Gallery, Florence.

== History ==
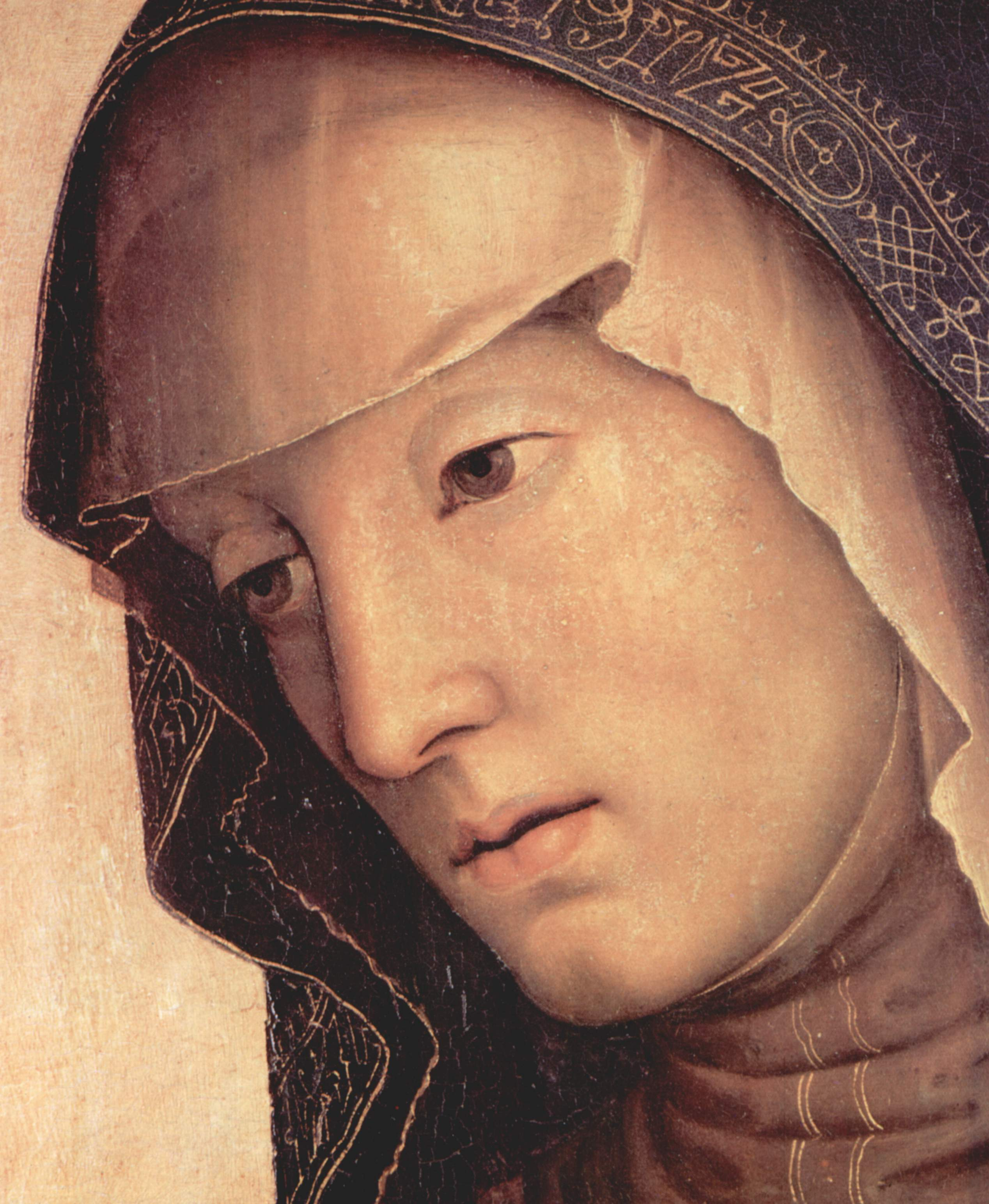
Detail of Mary's face.

The work was painted for the church of the convent of San Giusto alle mura together with the Agony in the Garden and a Crucifixion. Renaissance art biographer Giorgio Vasari saw them in side altars of the church of San Giovanni Battista alla Calza, after the original location had been destroyed during the Siege of Florence in 1529. It was moved to the Uffizi in the 20th century.

The dating of the work is disputed: it varies from 1482, the year of Perugino's return from Rome, to a slightly later period, although before the end of the century, when the artist started to use only line oil, which in these works is used only at an experimental level.

The painting was restored in 1998.

== Description ==
The scene of the Pietà was depicted by Perugino under a portico, a typical theme of his art in the 1480s and 1490s (used for example in the Albani-Torlonia Polyptych of the Madonna with Child Enthroned between Saints John the Baptist and Sebastian). The serene landscape with light trees is also common in his paintings of the period.

Such as in the German Vesperbilder, Jesus's body is horizontal and quite rigid, also held by John the Evangelist on the left and Mary Magdalene on the right. At the sides are further saints, a young one (Nicodemus) on the left, with the hands joined in his chest, and an aged one (Joseph of Arimathea) on the right, looking down.

The use of less pale tonalities for Mary Magdalene is similar to that used by Luca Signorelli at the time.

== Sources ==
- Garibaldi, Vittoria (2004). "Perugino". Pittori del Rinascimento (in Italian). Florence: Scala.
