= Crucifixion with Saints (Annibale Carracci) =

1583 painting

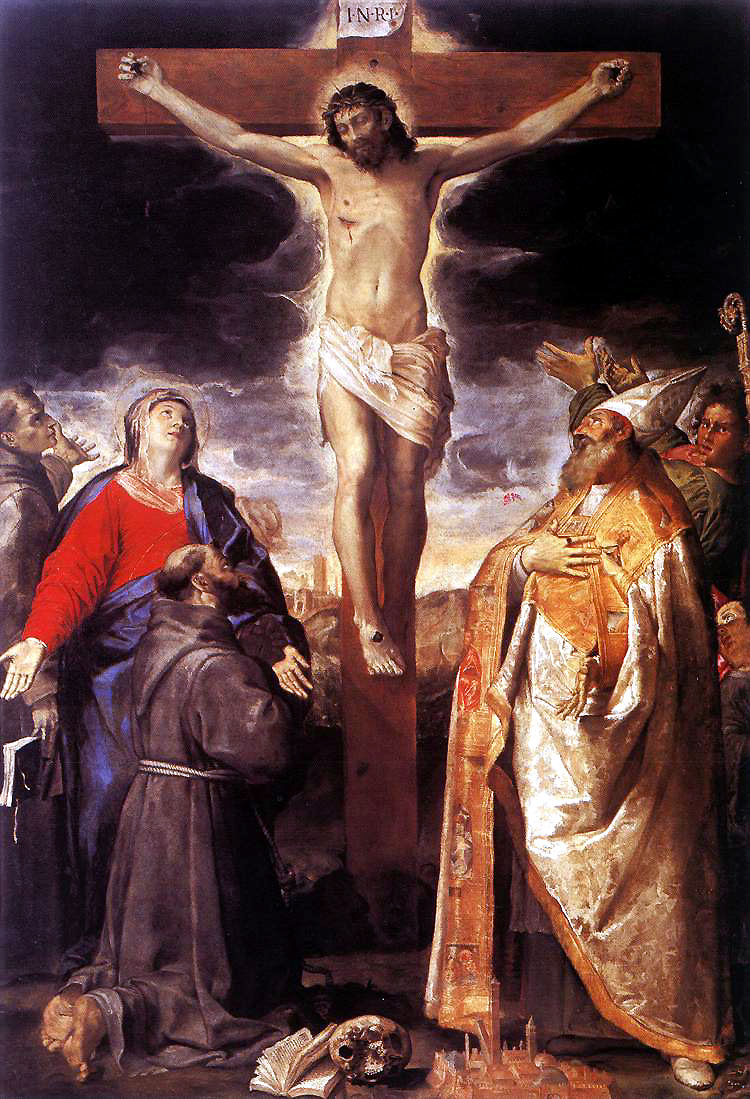
Crucifixion with Saints (1583) by Annibale Carracci

Crucifixion with Saints or Crucifixion with Mourners and Saints Bernardino of Siena, Francis of Assisi and Petronius is an oil painting on canvas executed in 1583 by the Italian painter Annibale Carracci, now in the church of Santa Maria della Carità in Bologna. The work was originally sited in the Macchiavelli chapel in San Nicolò di San Felice, Bologna, next to Santa Maria della Carità, which was destroyed by bombing during the Second World War. It was then temporarily moved to the Soprintendenza di Bologna and finally to its current home.

== Dating ==
In Felsina Pittrice in 1678, Carlo Cesare Malvasia stated that Carracci produced the work when he was eighteen (defining it as "the first work ever to come from the great Annibale's brush") and that the commission was initially offered to Ludovico Carracci, who decided the offered payment was too little and so passed it onto his young cousin Annibale. However, this account is unreliable, since cleaning in the 1920s revealed a date of 1583 on the canvas, at which point Annibale was twenty-three. That still makes it his earliest surviving work and his first surviving work for a public audience, though it throws doubt on Malvasia's dating, since a church commission is unlikely to have been his first work, instead indicating that Carracci was already a successful artist

Malvasia also states that older and more established artists in Bologna disapproved of the painting's realism (calling its figure of Christ a "naked porter") and criticised the composition's disharmony, the inaccurate and fast brushwork and the lack of decorum seen, for example, in Francis' calloused feet. Modern art historians instead see these features as Annibale (albeit with a youthful uncertainty) attempting to break away from the late-Mannerist style then dominant in Bologna and establish a new artistic language founded in realism.

== Analysis ==
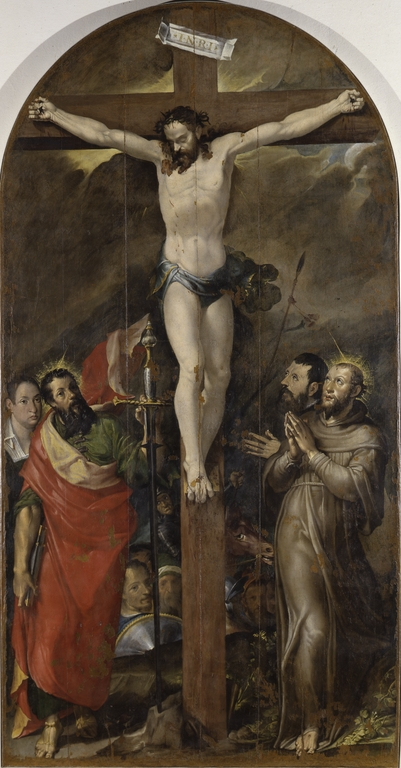
Bartolomeo Passarotti, Crucifixion with Saints, ca.1560–1570, Collezioni Comunali d'Arte di Palazzo d'Accursio, Bologna

With a serene expression and his head tilted to the left, the figure of Christ looks down at a group of saints. Francis of Assisi kneels before the cross in front of the Virgin Mary, whilst Petronius stands on the other side in brocaded episcopal vestments, with an altar boy holding his crosier behind him, blocking the viewer's view of John the Evangelist behind them.

Tangencies have been identified with the Crucifixion with Ulisse Gozzadini as Donor by Orazio Samacchini in the basilica of Santa Maria dei Servi, characterised, like that of Annibale, by the monumentality of the figures in the foreground. Also compositions dedicated to the same theme by Bartolomeo Passarotti are equally indicated as possible points of reference to which the young painter could have looked for this first important commission.

The attention of each of those present is devotedly turned to the dying Lord: their glances and gestures are explicitly directed to the cross, which is thus indicated as the fulcrum of the composition, and to the observer. The frontality of the monumental crucifixion favors this effect as does the gesture of the evangelist who invites the observer to join in the adoration of the cross.

The lighting coming from the left floods the lower part of the composition, while darkness descends from above but is unable to envelop the figure of Christ, isolated by a halo of supernatural light.

Although this work broke with the Bolognese tradition that preceded him, Annibale seems to have derived some details and compositional solutions for his Crucifixion from his fellow citizen painters, who were already established masters when the canvas of San Nicolò was dismissed.

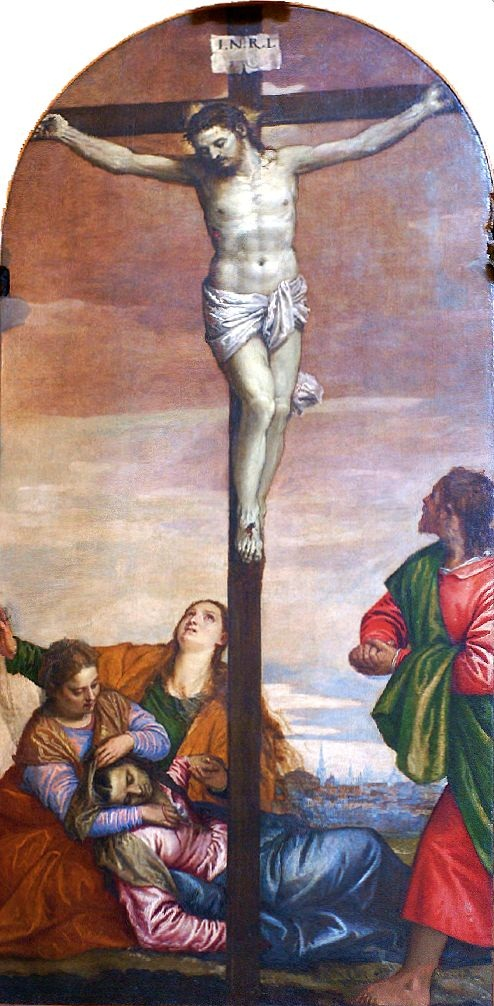
Paolo Veronese, Crucifixion, 1560–1565, Chiesa di San Sebastiano, Venice

The symmetrical division of the bystanders into two groups that form a sort of open Y in front of the cross also seems to refer to the Madonna with the patron saints of Bologna by Ercole Procaccini located in the church of San Giovanni in Monte.

Mary's pose has then been compared to that of Saint Elizabeth in the fresco by Pellegrino Tibaldi depicting the announcement of the birth of John the Baptist in the Basilica of San Giacomo Maggiore, while the devotional attitude with which Saint Petronius entrusts the city of Bologna to Christ – the model of which is at the feet of the saint – could have been inspired by the similar composition seen in the Madonna in glory with saints, again by Passarotti (Basilica of San Petronio), where, as in Annibale, an altar boy holds the pastoral staff of the Bolognese bishop.

Nevertheless, the distance between Annibale Carracci's debut and the works of his predecessors is profound. In cocntrast to the artistic methods and values of the contemporary Bolognese Mannerist tradition, the figures of the saints under the cross, like that of Christ, are depicted in a simple way, with a powerful and natural corporeality, probably the result of studies from life. Completely absent are the affectations of the "manner" so evident for example in the Passarotti Crucifixion of the municipal collections, where Saint Francis is a tired quotation of Michelangelo's Rachel.

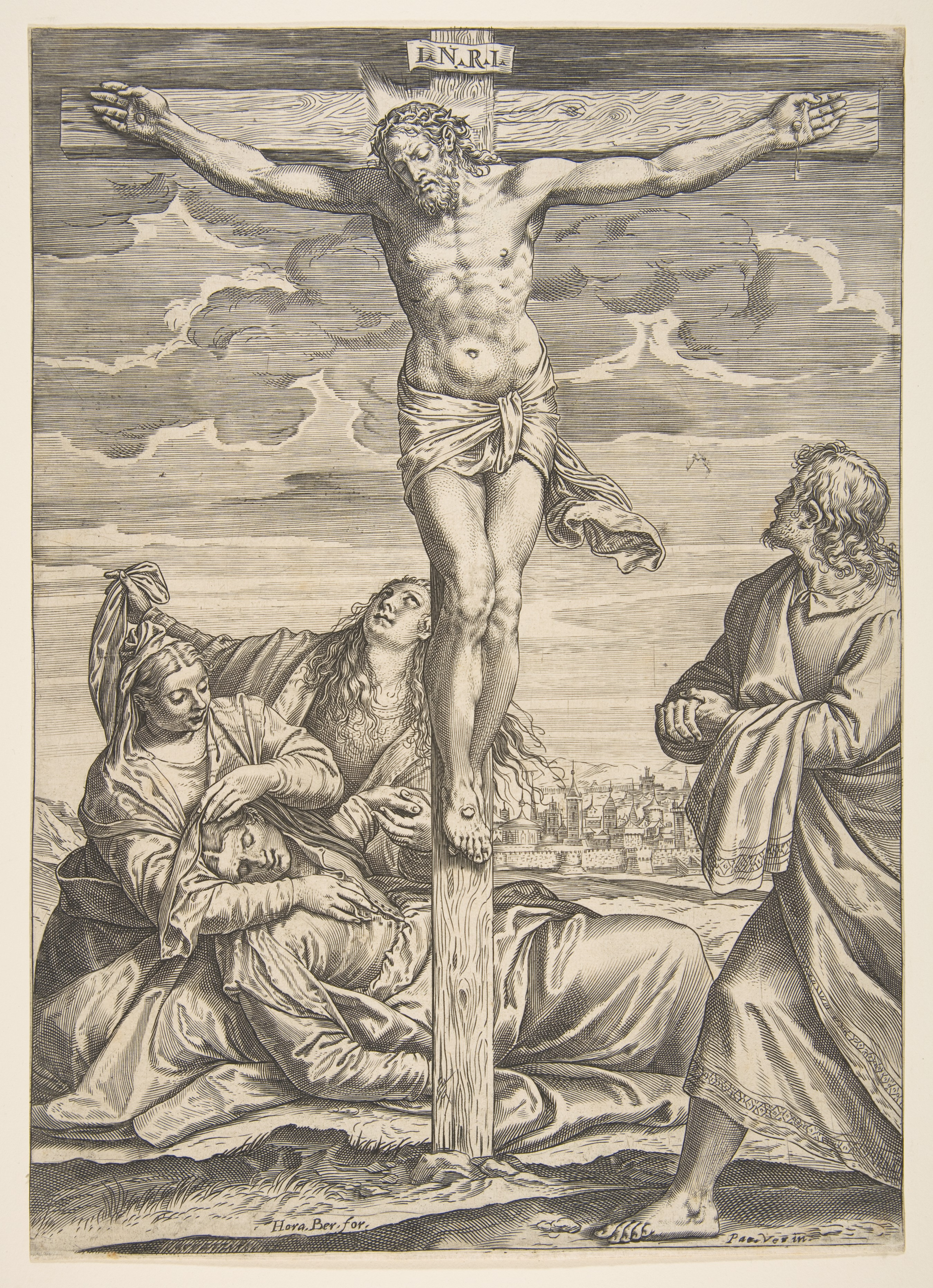
Agostino Carracci after Veronese, Crucifixion, ca.1582

Even the comparison between Carracci's work and that of an identical subject by another celebrated Bolognese master of the time, Prospero Fontana, is eloquently illustrative of the new path sought by Annibale. Fontana's altarpiece, in fact, executed only a few years before Annibale's public debut, is characterised by a decorative elegance and a conventional representation of the pain of the death of Christ. The young Carracci moves in the opposite direction: the piety of his saints is composed and makes an emotional appeal to the viewer. Carracci reinforces this effect by placing his Crucifixion in a credible space – open towards the horizon where a view of the city can be seen – inhabited by his saints full of strength and vitality and by the physiognomies, not idealised but familiar, of ordinary people.

There are differing opinions regarding who the young artist's models of reference might have been in this first, public, attempt to overcome the "clichés" of local late Mannerism. A first view holds that the canvas of Saint Nicholas is the result of Carracci's first reflections on Venetian painting and in particular on the art of Veronese. The Crucifixion executed by Veronese for the church of San Sebastiano in Venice has been indicated as an important source of inspiration for Carracci, even if the work was probably not directly known to him (at that time) but rather studied from the engraving made by his brother Agostino shortly before the commission of the painting for the church in Strada San Felice.

A different opinion, however, denies any Venetian influence on the work and maintains that Carracci arrived at his result more by instinct than by deliberate study, rather having the intuition, "scandalous" for the time, to introduce into a religious painting destined for the altar of a church, a tone – in the figures of the saints, in the roughness of the line – more characteristic of genre painting, a field in which the young Carracci had already successfully experimented.

It has also been asked whether Annibale's stimuli may have included the recommendations that Cardinal Gabriele Paleotti was formulating at that time in Bologna in his Discourse on Sacred and Profane Images (1582). Text in which, on the basis of the conclusions reached in the Council of Trent on religious art, a simpler painting was hoped for, clearly understandable by the faithful for the benefit of their edification.

An immediate reaction to Carracci's canvas came in the form of a painting of the Crucifixion with saints by Bartolomeo Cesi for the basilica of San Martino which "revises" and "corrects" (that is, normalizes) the noisy public debut of Annibale Carracci.

== Gallery ==
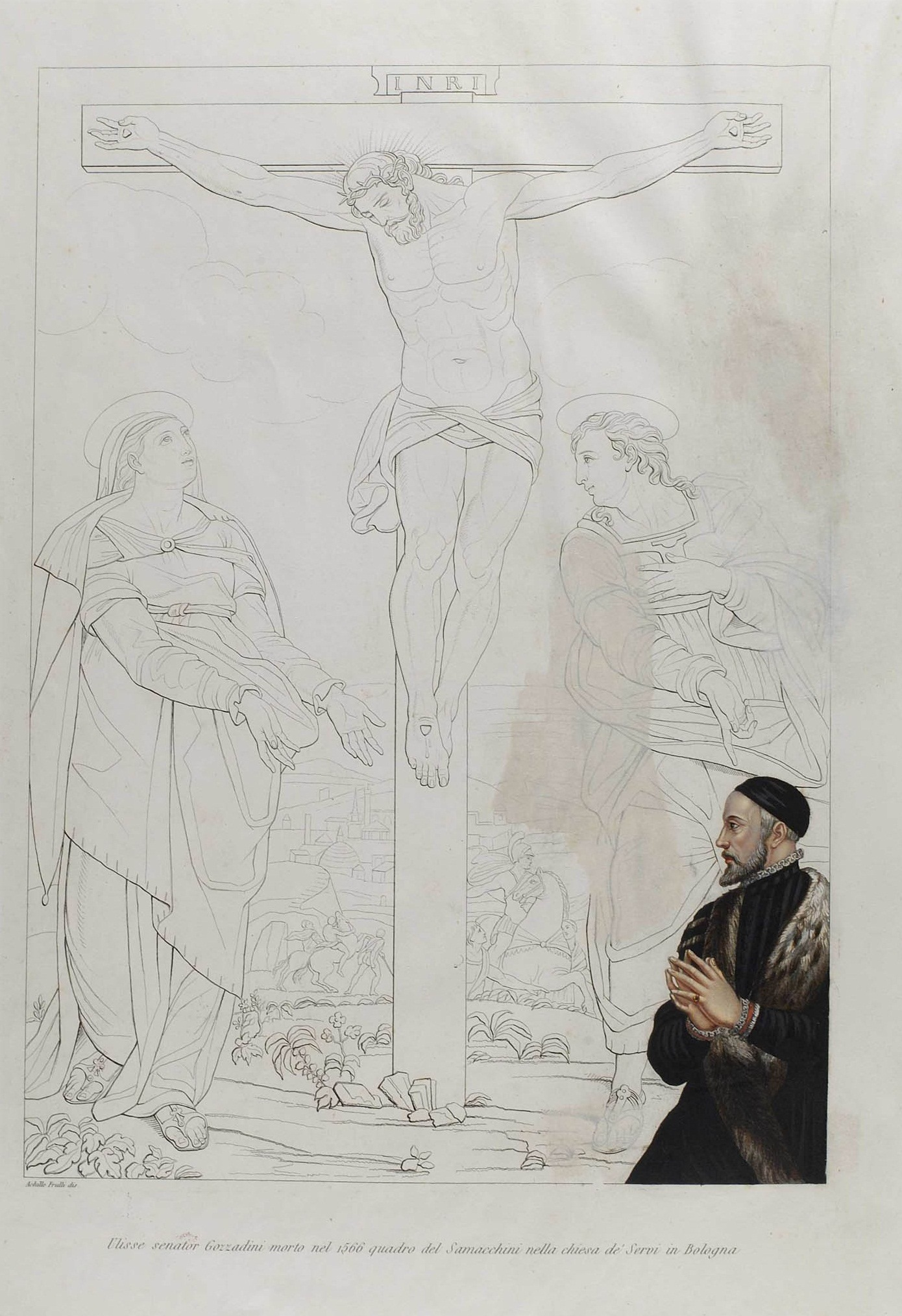
19th-century print of Crucifixion with Ulisse Gozzadini as Donor (1566–1568) by Orazio Samacchini in Basilica di Santa Maria dei Servi in Bologna

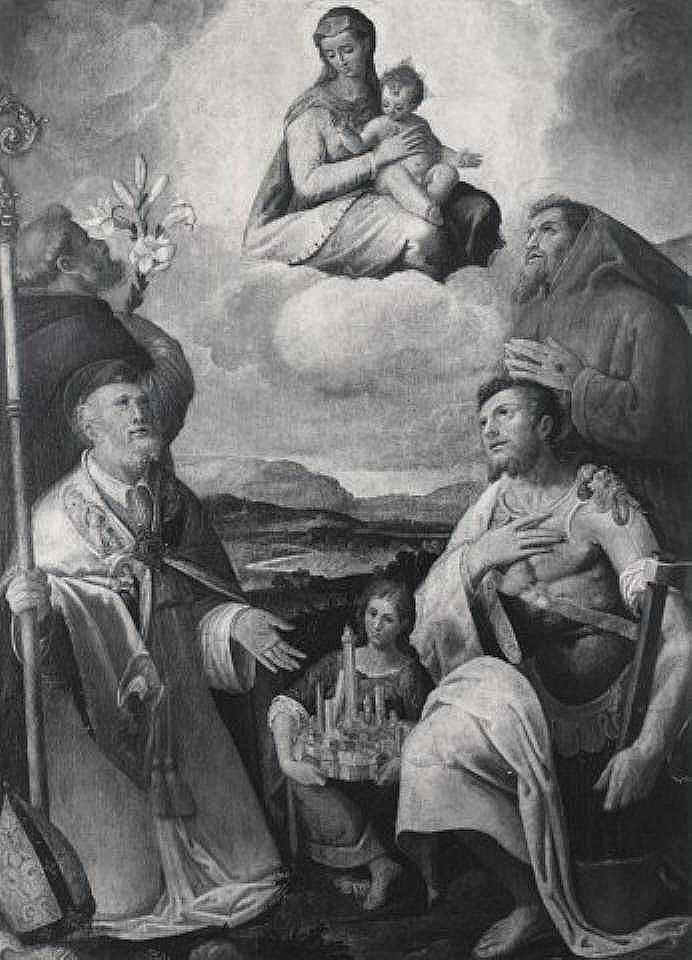
Ercole Procaccini, Madonna in glory with the patron saints of Bologna, 1570–1580, Bologna, Chiesa di San Giovanni in Monte

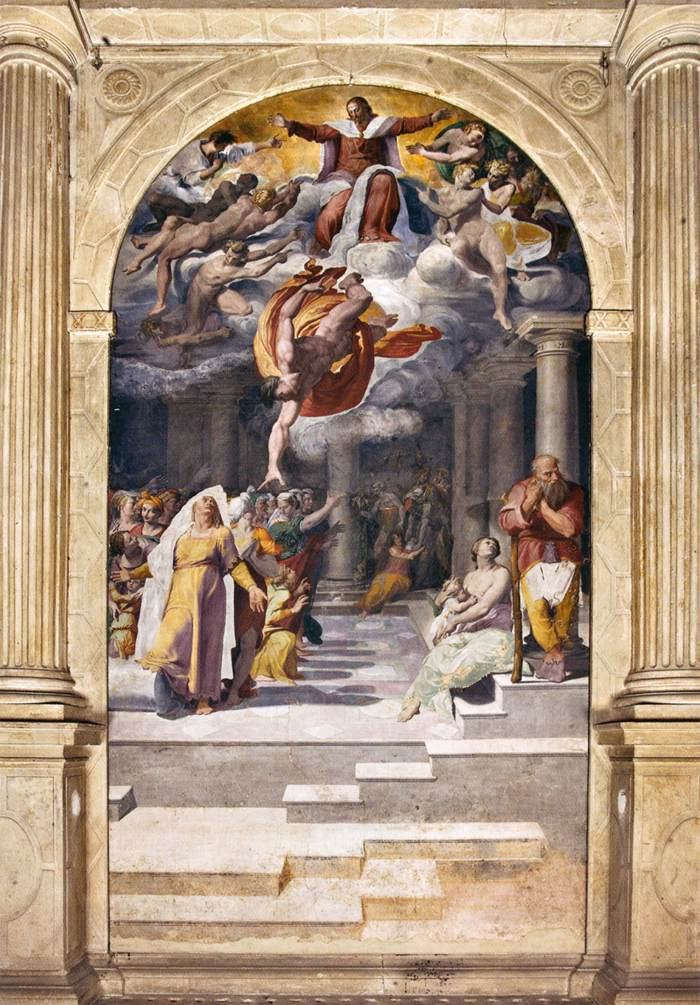
Pellegrino Tibaldi, Annunciation of the Birth of John the Baptist, 1551–1553, Bologna, Basilica di San Giacomo Maggiore

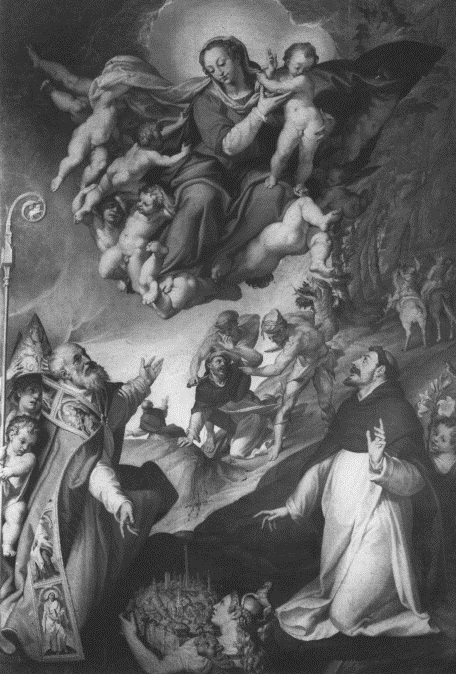
Bartolomeo Passarotti, Madonna in glory with saints, circa 1570, Bologna, Basilica di San Petronio

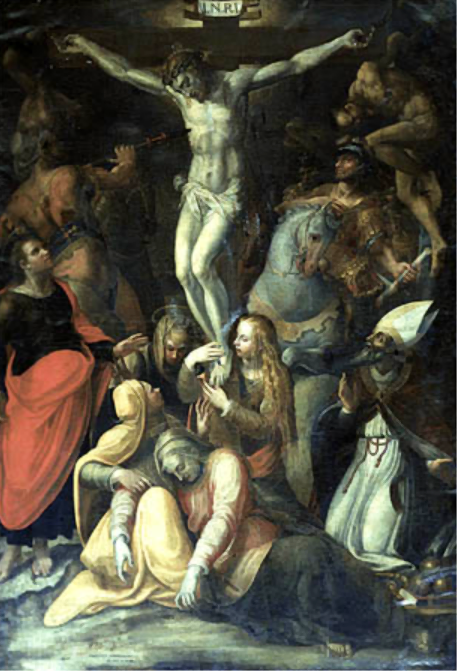
Prospero Fontana, Crucifixion, circa 1580, Museo del Convento di San Giuseppe, Bologna

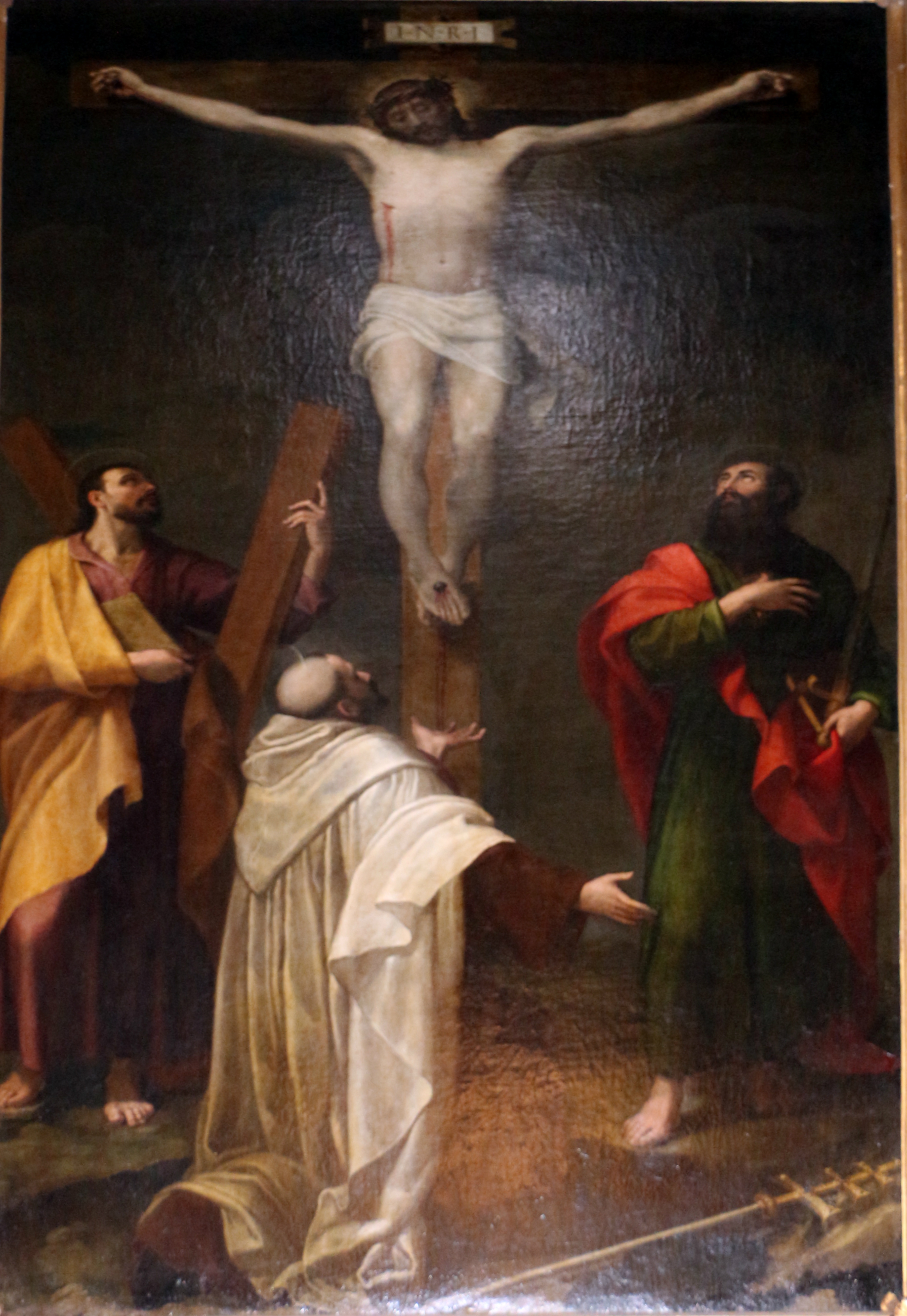
Bartolomeo Cesi, Crucifixion with saints, 1584, Basilica di San Martino, Bologna
