= Crucifixion (after van Eyck?) =

Painting attributed to the workshop of Jan van Eyck

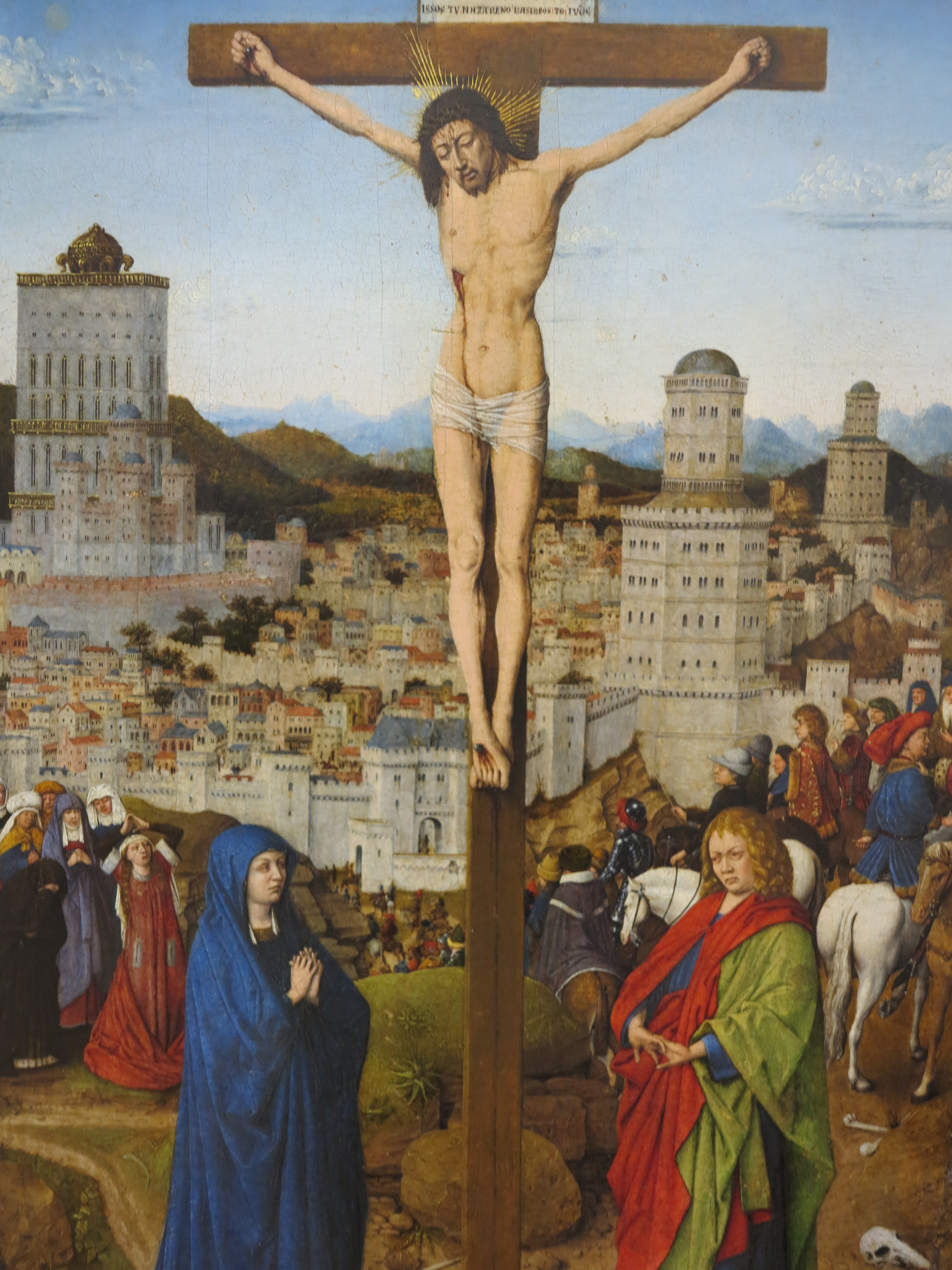
Crucifixion, 46 x 31cm. Ca' d'Oro, Venice

Crucifixion is a c. 1440-50 oil on panel painting usually attributed to the workshop of Jan van Eyck, who worked from one of his original designs, or his older brother Hubert. It shows the crucified Christ, attended by his mother Mary, and St. John the Evangelist.

The scene is set before an expansive and highly detailed depiction of Jerusalem. Mary and John are presented in deep sorrow, but more dignified and composed than the wailing women on the left hand side. On the right is a group of horsemen who seem unmoved by the execution, acting as if this was their daily business.

The painting was in Veneto in Italy by the mid 15th century, where it was believed to be a lost copy of a van Eyck original. It was highly influential on the development of Italian art, and was widely copied, both directly and in adaptions.

== Sources ==
- Ferrari, Simone. Van Eyck: Masters of Art. Munich: Prestel, 2013. ISBN 3-7913-4826-4
