= Crucifixion (Vouet) =

Painting by Simon Vouet

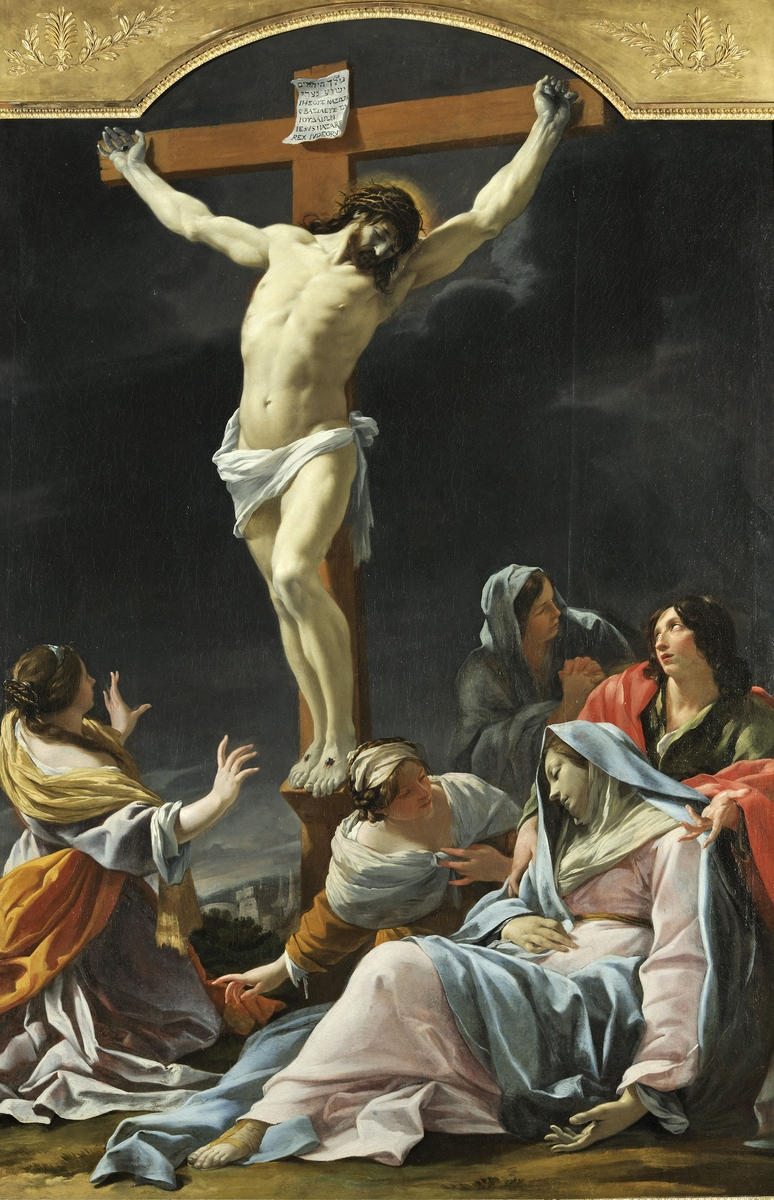
- Artist: Simon Vouet
- Year: 1636-1637
- Medium: Oil on canvas
- Dimensions: 216 cm × 146 cm (85 in × 57 in)
- Location: Museum of Fine Arts of Lyon, Lyon

Crucifixion is an oil on canvas painting by Simon Vouet, executed in 1636–1627. This painting is part of a set of three works, together with the paintings representing the Last Supper and the incredulity of St. Thomas. It is now in the Museum of Fine Arts of Lyon.

== History ==
During the realization of this work, Vouet was the painter of King Louis XIII and one of the best known at his time. The painting was commissioned by Cardinal Pierre Séguier. He wanted it for the chapel of his mansion. This work was accompanied by two other paintings: The Last Supper and the Incredulity of Saint Thomas. These works represent three particular scenes from the life of Jesus between the Last Supper and his death on the cross. The Crucifixion was carried out between 1636 and 1637. After completed, the paintings were kept in the cardinal's chapel. Being arranged above the altar, these works were above all religious. It was subsequently offered in 1816 to the Musée des Beaux-Arts of Lyon by Cardinal Joseph Fesch. The painting is always surrounded by the two paintings mentioned.

== Description ==
This canvas is a representation of the death of Jesus Christ on the cross. The characters present at his side seem to be struck by the scene, their gazes converge on the face of Christ. The painter chooses to represent the precise moment of the end of the agony of Christ, the tilted head seems to indicate his death. Mary painted in the lower right is presented in agony, as if she shared the pain of her son's death. The Virgin Mary is supported by the apostle John, looking at Jesus on the cross. On the left of the painting stands Mary Magdalen, from behind, startled by the scene, in a gesture of recoil and arms outstretched.

Jesus is highlighted by the white light projected on him, which makes him the central character of the work. In addition, we can distinguish, by their amplitudes and the impression of movement, a drape. The work is particular by the impressive drape of the virgin in the foreground as if to show the magnificence of the character. Vouet also made engravings of this drape, this shows all the work done by the painter for this precise detail.

The faces as well as the light, which recall the painter's Italian training, reinforce all the theatricality and solemnity of the scene.
