= Crucifixion (Bramantino) =

Painting by Bramantino

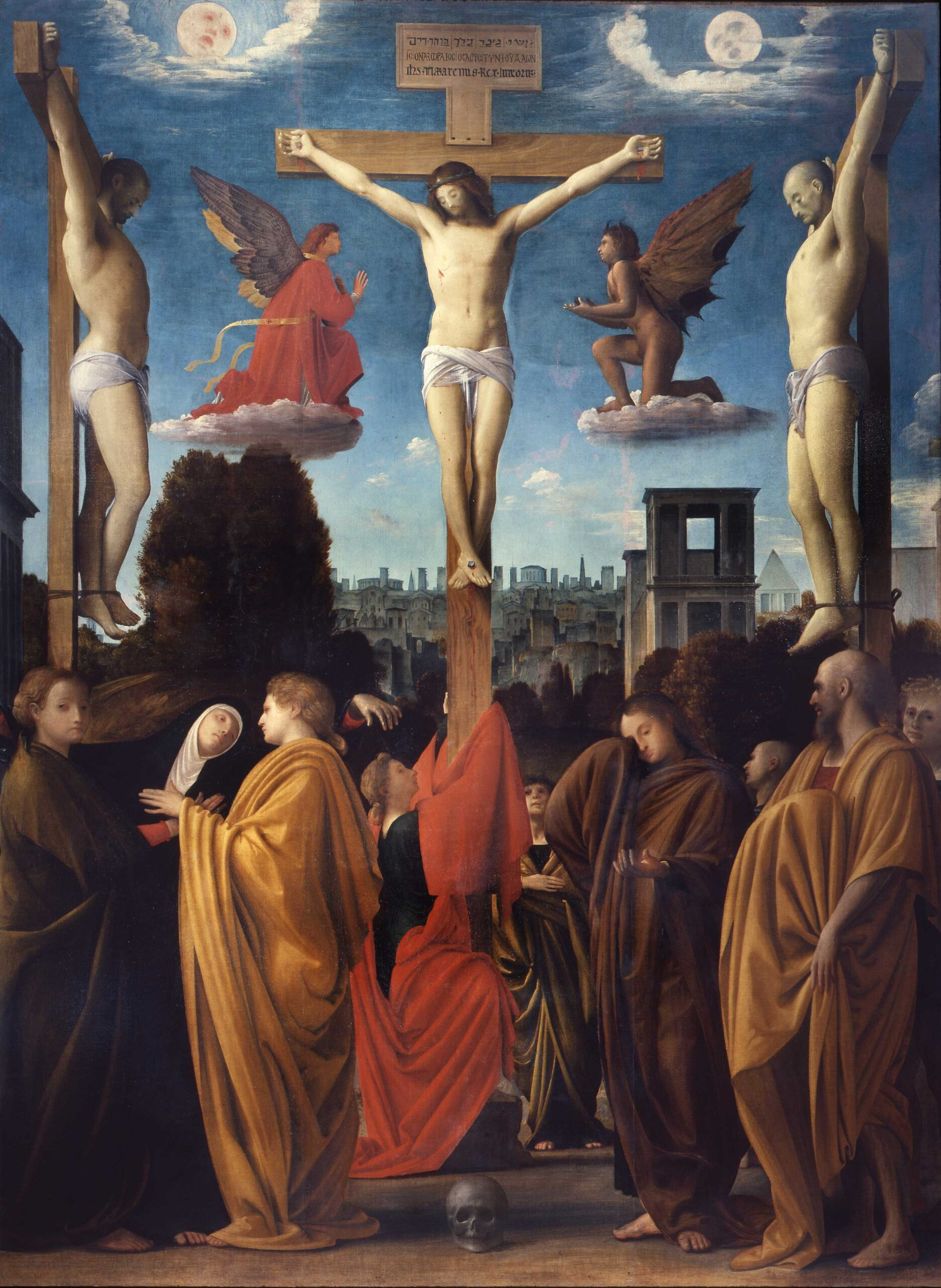
- Artist: Bramantino
- Year: 1503-1511
- Medium: Oil on canvas
- Dimensions: 372 cm × 370 cm (146 in × 150 in)
- Location: Pinacoteca di Brera; Milan

Crucifixion is an oil painting on canvas executed between 1503–1511 by the Italian Renaissance painter Bramantino in the Pinacoteca di Brera, Milan. It was first recorded in that gallery's collections in 1806, without any earlier provenance.

The work's original location and commissioner are unknown; the former may have been Milan Cathedral or the church of Santa Maria in Brera. The panel might have been kept in storage due to its unorthodox iconography. Some theorise that it was produced in the milieu of religious reform movements current in Milan during its occupation by the French (later opposed by Carlo Borromeo and the Counter-Reformation), or that it was directly commissioned by Marshal Gian Giacomo Trivulzio, the city's governor on behalf of the French, who had also commissioned the cartoons for the Trivulzio tapestries from Bramantino.

== Description and style ==
The work was painted after Bramantino's return from Rome, when he developed a particular sense for architectural backgrounds, as evident here. The crucifixion is divided into two registers: an upper and celestial one, with the cross of Christ in the center between those of the thieves, and a lower and earthly one, with the mourners and other characters.

Among the apparitions of an anthropomorphicsun and moon (with very clear and scenic clouds reminiscent of the works of Albrecht Altdorfer), Christ, with a smooth and geometrically set body (as are those of the two thieves) is flanked by a devil and an angel kneeling on clouds.

Below, a fainting Mary is supported by a pious woman and John the Apostle. Mary Magdalene raises her arms towards the cross (a fifteenth-century motif), and a young man dries his tears with the sleeve of his cloak. However, a sense of very measured expression of feelings prevails, with the artist appearing more interested in the plastic rendering of the bodies and simplified drapery and the effects of light, as in the almost metallic skull found in the center of the scene below – a typical memento mori.

The background shows symmetrical elements (trees and a tower building between crosses), as well as a city perched on a ridge, full of classical buildings.

=== Interpretation ===
According to the hypothesis (which is not unanimously accepted) by Germano Mulazzani, the iconography of the painting would refer to a passage from the Sermones de Oneribus by Aelredo di Rievaulx, describing the origin of the Church from Judaism (the temple in the background), which derives from the Egyptian (the pyramid) and pagan tradition (the two figures on the right, one of whom cries as a sign of repentance), while Christ connects the Old and the New Testament – the moon and the sun. While the devil declares himself defeated, kneeling, the Church (Magdalene) embraces the cross recognizing its origin in it.
