= Crucifixion with the Virgin, Saint John and Saint Mary Magdalene =

Painting by Anthony van Dyck

Crucifixion with the Virgin Mary, St John and St Mary Magdalene
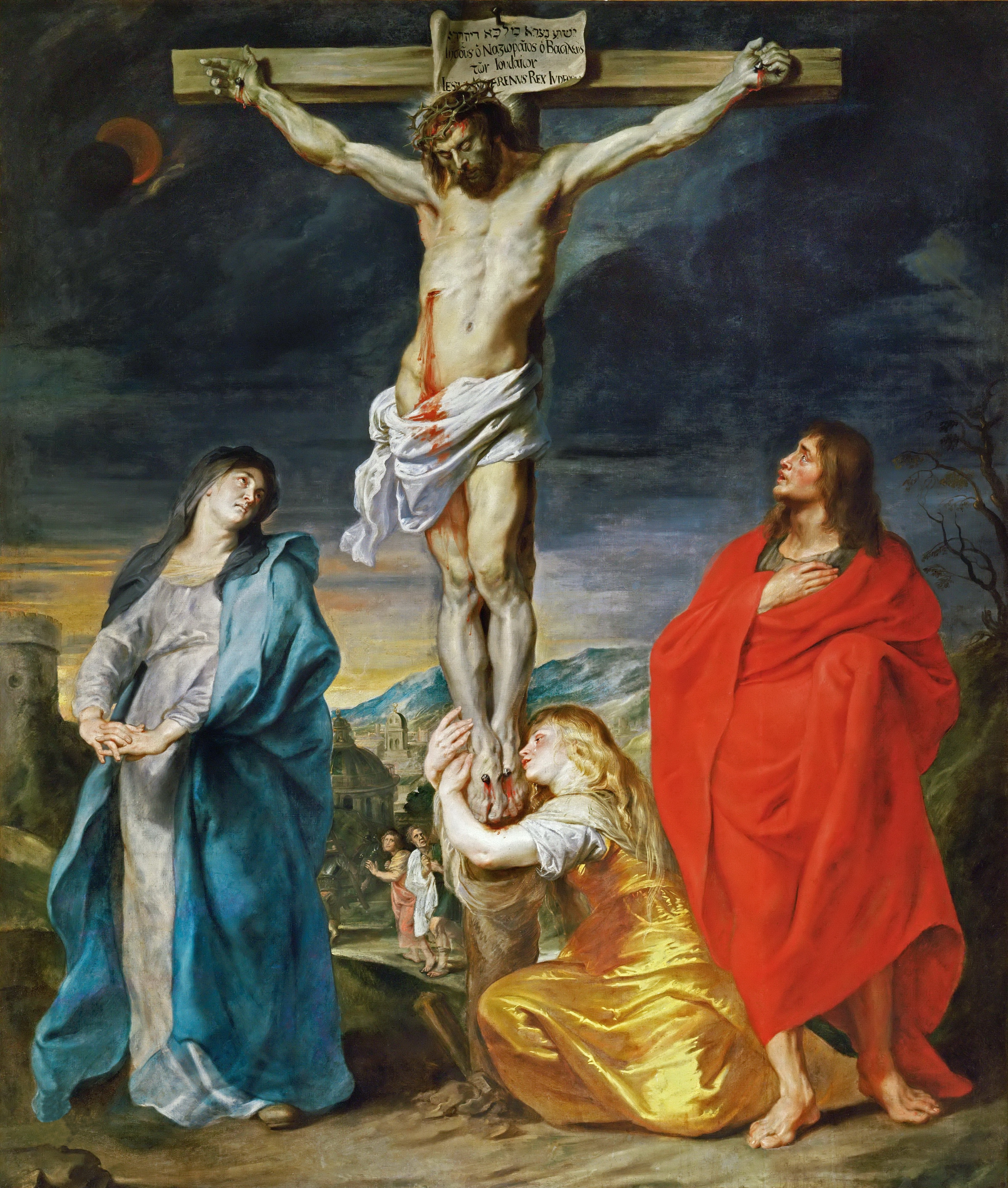
- Artist: Anthony van Dyck
- Year: 17th century
- Medium: oil paint, canvas
- Dimensions: 330 cm (130 in) × 282 cm (111 in)
- Location: Room 800, Paris, France
- Owner: French State
- Accession: INV 1766

The Crucifixion with the Virgin, Saint John and Saint Mary Magdalene is a painting by the Flemish artist Anthony van Dyck. He created it between 1617 and 1619 as the high altarpiece for the Jesuit church in Bergues, near Dunkirk, during his time as an assistant to Peter Paul Rubens, to whom the painting was long attributed. It was paid to Rubens in 1621 and appears to have been sold around 1746. In 1749, it was purchased by Louis XV of France in Antwerp to serve as the high altarpiece of Saint-Louis de Versailles at the Palace of Versailles. It is now housed in the Louvre, in Paris.

== See also ==
- List of paintings by Anthony van Dyck
