= Albani Torlonia Polyptych =

Painting by Pietro Perugino

Albani Torlonia Altarpiece
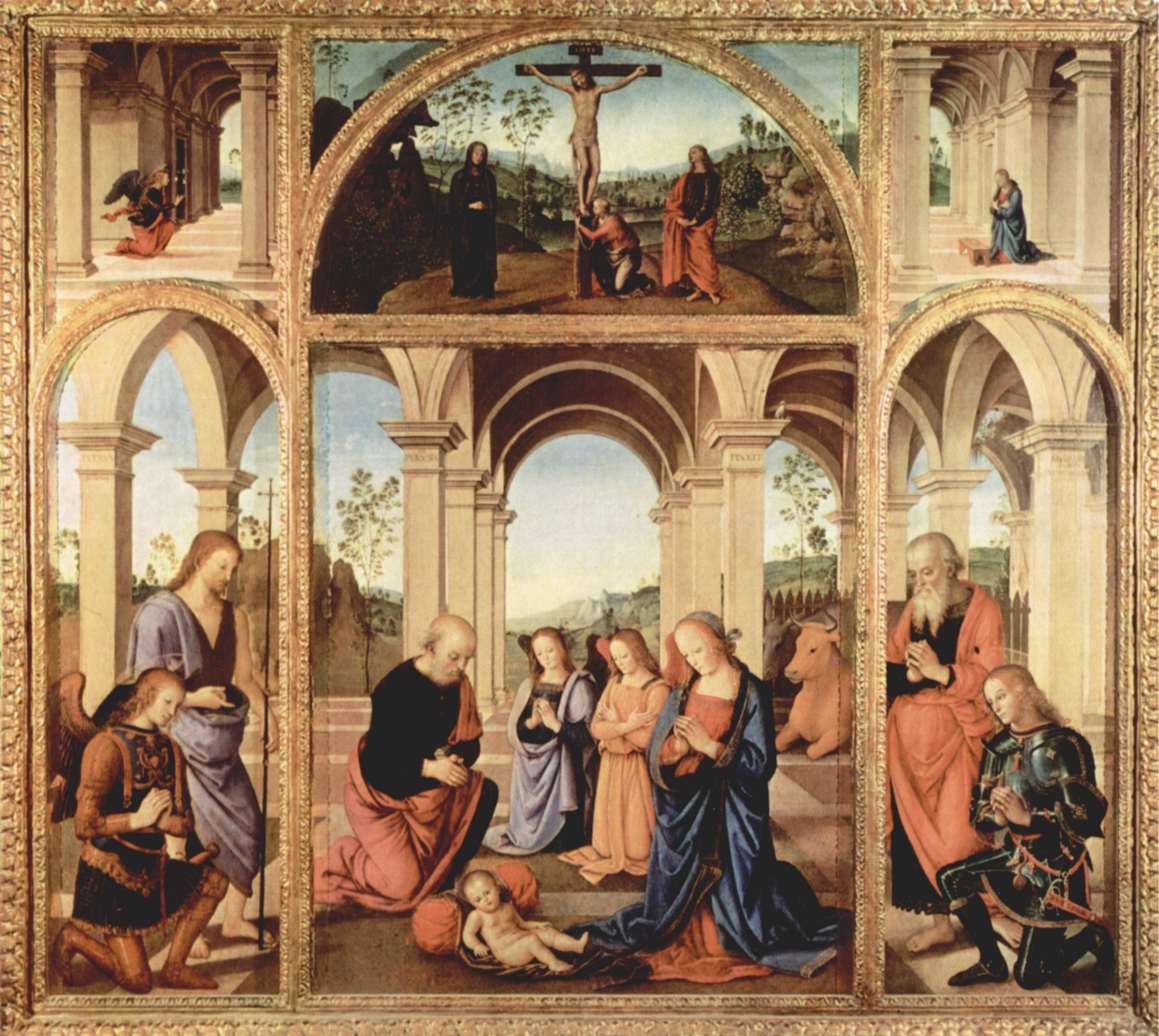
- Artist: Pietro Perugino
- Year: c. 1491
- Medium: Tempera on panel
- Dimensions: 174 cm × 88 cm (69 in × 35 in)
- Location: Torlonia Collection, Rome

The Albani Torlonia Altarpiece is a painting by the Italian Renaissance painter Pietro Perugino, executed in 1491 and housed in the Torlonia Collection, Rome. It was commissioned by Cardinal Giuliano della Rovere, the future Pope Julius II.

== Description ==
The polyptych includes two levels: the lower one has in the centre a Nativity scene and, at the sides, two arched panels depicting Michael the Archangel, John the Baptist, Jerome and Saint George, sharing the same background. The upper one as, in the centre, a lunette with a Crucifixion, flanked by two small panels, with the Annunciation Angel and the Annunciation to the Virgin, set in a double portico.

The main scene, that of the Nativity, is perhaps inspired by that painted by Perugino in the Sistine Chapel, which is now lost. The Child is housed in the Virgin's dress, lying on a red cushion; Mary and Saint Joseph are adoring him, flanked by two kneeling angels and, behind, the ox and the donkey. The scene is set inside a perspective portico, while the background includes a series of hills.

== Sources ==
- Garibaldi, Vittoria (2004). "Perugino". Pittori del Rinascimento. Florence: Scala.
