= Pazzi Crucifixion =

Fresco by Pietro Perugino

Florence Cistercians Crucifixion
- The three main panels.
- Artist: Perugino
- Year: c.1495
- Medium: fresco
- Dimensions: 480 cm × 812 cm (190 in × 320 in)
- Location: Santa Maria Maddalena dei Pazzi, Florence

The Crucifixion with Mary Magdalene (sometimes called the Pazzi Crucifixion) is a fresco of c. 1495 of the Crucifixion of Christ by Perugino in the chapter house of the Cistercian monastery of Santa Maria Maddalena dei Pazzi in Florence. It is his most notable work in Florence. It was a commission from the Pucci family - Antonio Billi's account book reports Dionigi and Giovanna Pucci commissioning a work from "Master Piero della Pieve a Chastello, a Perugian" on 20 November 1493 and paying 55 gold ducats on its completion on 20 April 1496.

The central panel shows Mary Magdalene (to whom the monastery church was dedicated in 1257) in prayer at the foot of the cross. The left panel shows the Virgin Mary with Saint Bernard (a major leader in the reform of Benedictine monasticism that caused the formation of the Cistercian order) and the right one shows John the Apostle with Saint Benedict. The three tall trees behind St Bernard may symbolise the Holy Trinity. A fourth panel on the north wall (the others are on the east wall) shows Christ lowering himself from the cross to hold the hands of St Bernard.

The work is also mentioned in 16th century sources, although it was forgotten after the monastery passed to Carmelite nuns in 1628. In 1867 the nuns moved out and the convent was abandoned, leading to the rediscovery of the fresco.

== Bibliography (in Italian) ==
- Vittoria Garibaldi, Perugino, in Pittori del Rinascimento, Scala, Florence, 2004 ISBN 88-8117-099-X
- Pierluigi De Vecchi, Elda Cerchiari, I tempi dell'arte, volume 2, Bompiani, Milan, 1999 ISBN 88-451-7212-0
- (in Italian) Entry on Polomuseale.firenze.it
