= Fontignano Madonna =

1522 fresco by Pietro Perugino

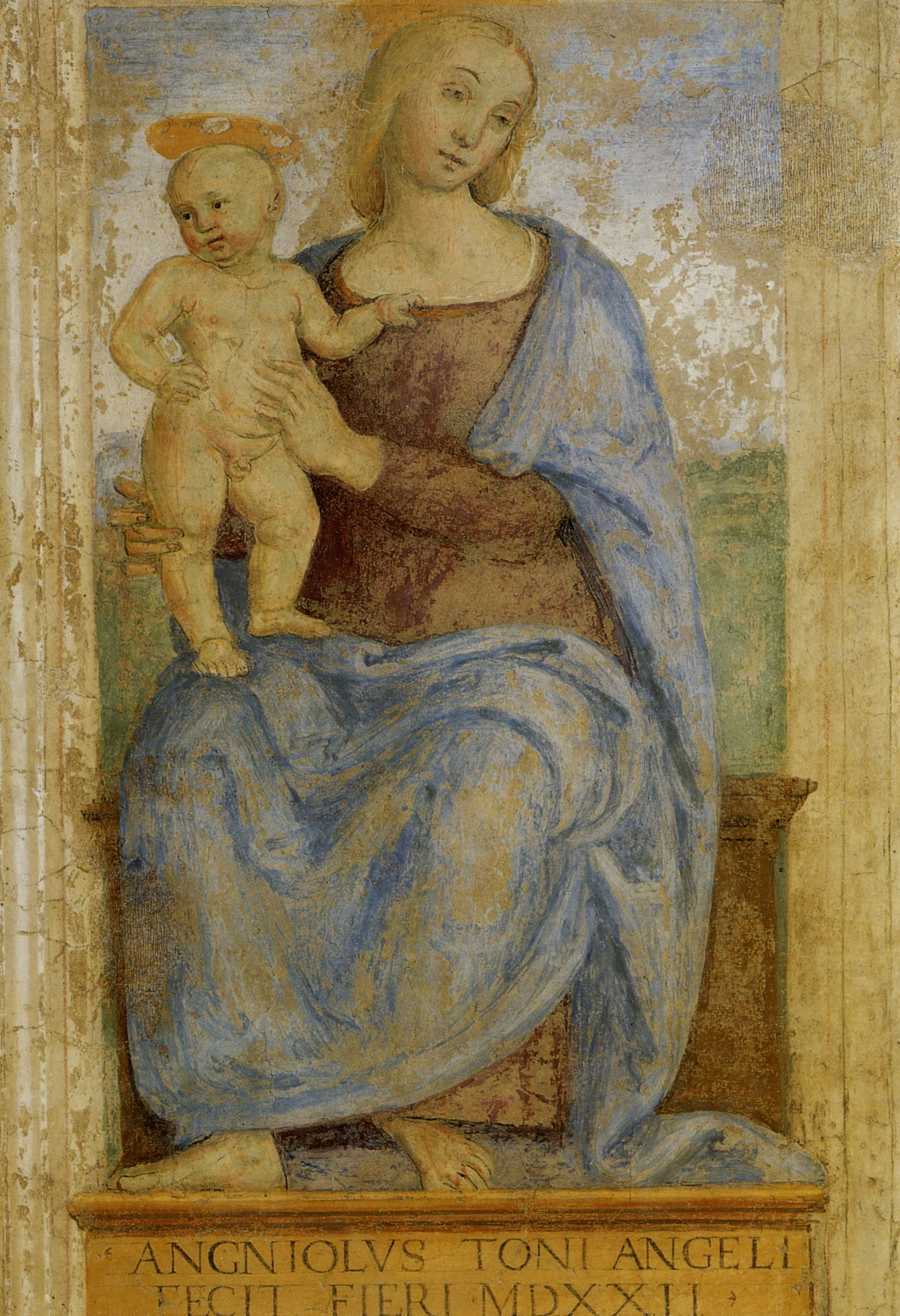
Fontignano Madonna (1522) by Perugino

The Fontignano Madonna is a 1522 fresco Madonna and Child by Perugino. Angniolus Toni Angeli and the Confraternity of the Annunciation commissioned him to decorate their church of S. Maria dell'Annunziata in Fontignano in 1521. It is his only surviving work in the church and probably reused his cartoons from Santa Maria Maggiore in Spello, such as those for the Spello Pietà. Angeli's name appears at the base of the work.
