= Spello Pietà =

Fresco by Pietro Perugino

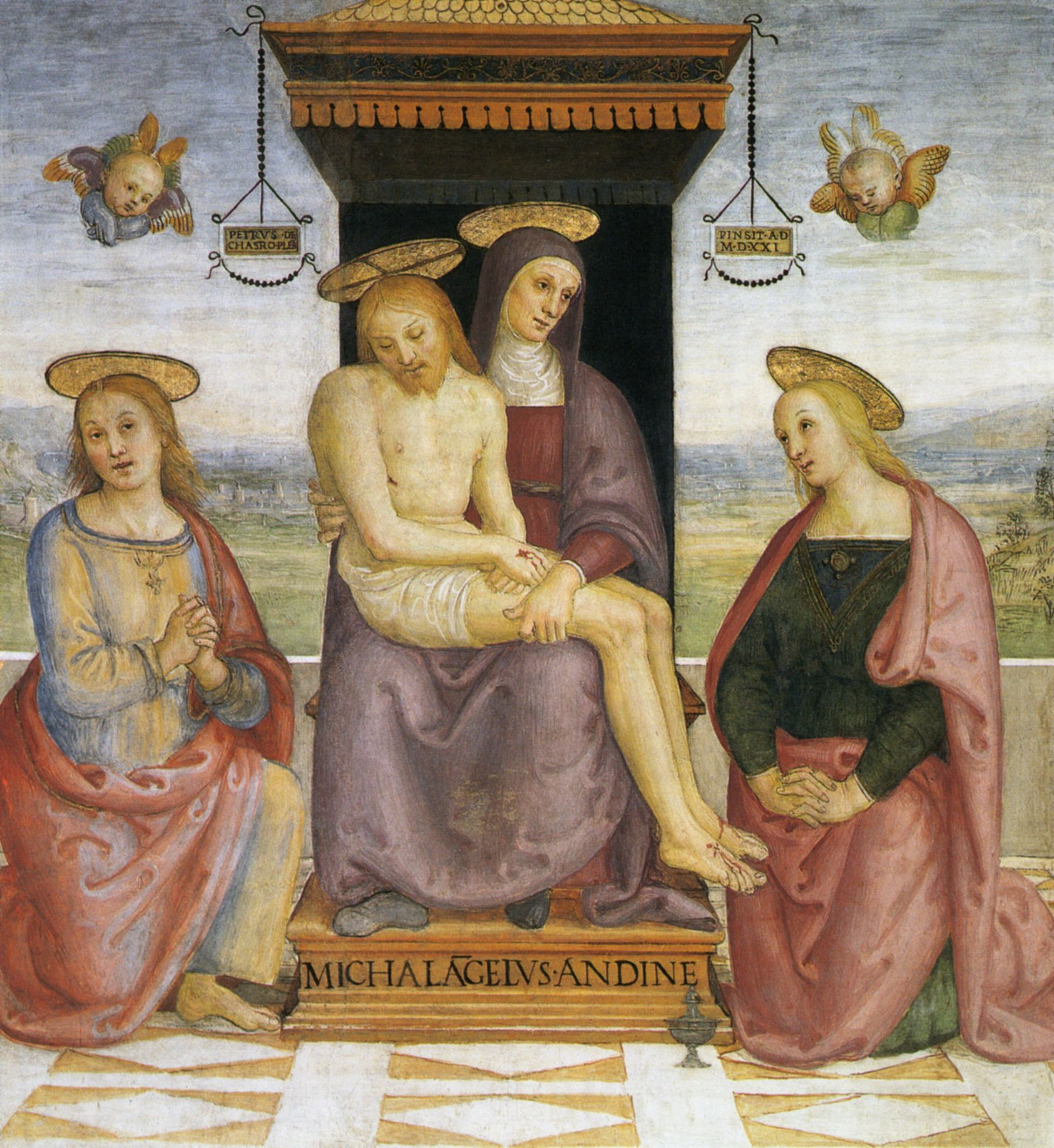
The fresco

The Spello Pietà is a fresco of the Pietà by Perugino executed in 1521–1522. It also shows John the Apostle and Mary Magdalene kneeling either side of the Virgin Mary. It is now sited in the left transept of the Chiesa Santa Maria Maggiore in Spello, but its origins are unknown.
