= Madelon =

Madelon is a given name and a surname. Notable people with the name include:

Given name:

- Madelon Baans (born 1977), retired breaststroke swimmer from the Netherlands, competed in three Summer Olympics
- Madelon Lubin Finkel, Professor of Professor of Population Health Sciences at Weill Cornell Medical College, New York City
- Madelon Hooykaas (born 1942), Dutch video artist, photographer and film maker
- Madelon Mason (1921–2011), American former model and pin-up girl
- Madelon Pigalle or Madeleine-Élisabeth Pigalle (1751–1827), French painter
- Madelon Szekely-Lulofs (1899–1958), Dutch writer and journalist, best known for writing novels set in Indonesia
- Madelon Vriesendorp (born 1945), Dutch artist, painter, sculptor and art collector

Surname:

- César Madelón (1927–2013), Argentine equestrian
- Leonardo Madelón (born 1963), Argentine former footballer and current manager

== See also ==
- The Sin of Madelon Claudet, 1931 American pre-Code drama film directed by Edgar Selwyn and starring Helen Hayes
- Saint-Cirq-Madelon, commune in the Lot department in south-western France
- La Madelon or Quand Madelon, also known in English as Madelon (I'll Be True to the Whole Regiment) is a French popular song of World War I
- Madelon (film), a 1955 French film directed by Jean Boyer
- Madaillan
- Madalaine
- Madalan
- Madalena (disambiguation)
- Madaline (disambiguation)
- Maddalena (disambiguation)
- Maddaloni
- Madelaine
- Madeleine (disambiguation)
- Madelena
- Madelin
- Madeline
- Madelyn
- Madelyne (disambiguation)
- Medalon
- Mădălin
- Mădălina (disambiguation)
