= Madelene =

Madelene is a given name. Notable people with the name include:

- Madelene Van Aardt (1896–1982), South African composer and teacher
- Madelene Göras (born 1983), Swedish football coach and former player
- Madelene Nordlund, Paralympic athlete from Sweden
- Madelene Rubinstein (born 1995), Norwegian judoka
- Madelene Sagström (born 1992), Swedish professional golfer
- Madelene Stavnar (born 2000), Norwegian professional golfer

== See also ==
- Madalena (disambiguation)
- Madaline (disambiguation)
- Maddalena (disambiguation)
- Maddalene (disambiguation)
- Madeleine (disambiguation)
- Madelyne (disambiguation)
