= Bascharage-Sanem railway station =

Railway station in Luxembourg

Coordinates: 49°33′30″N 05°55′30″E

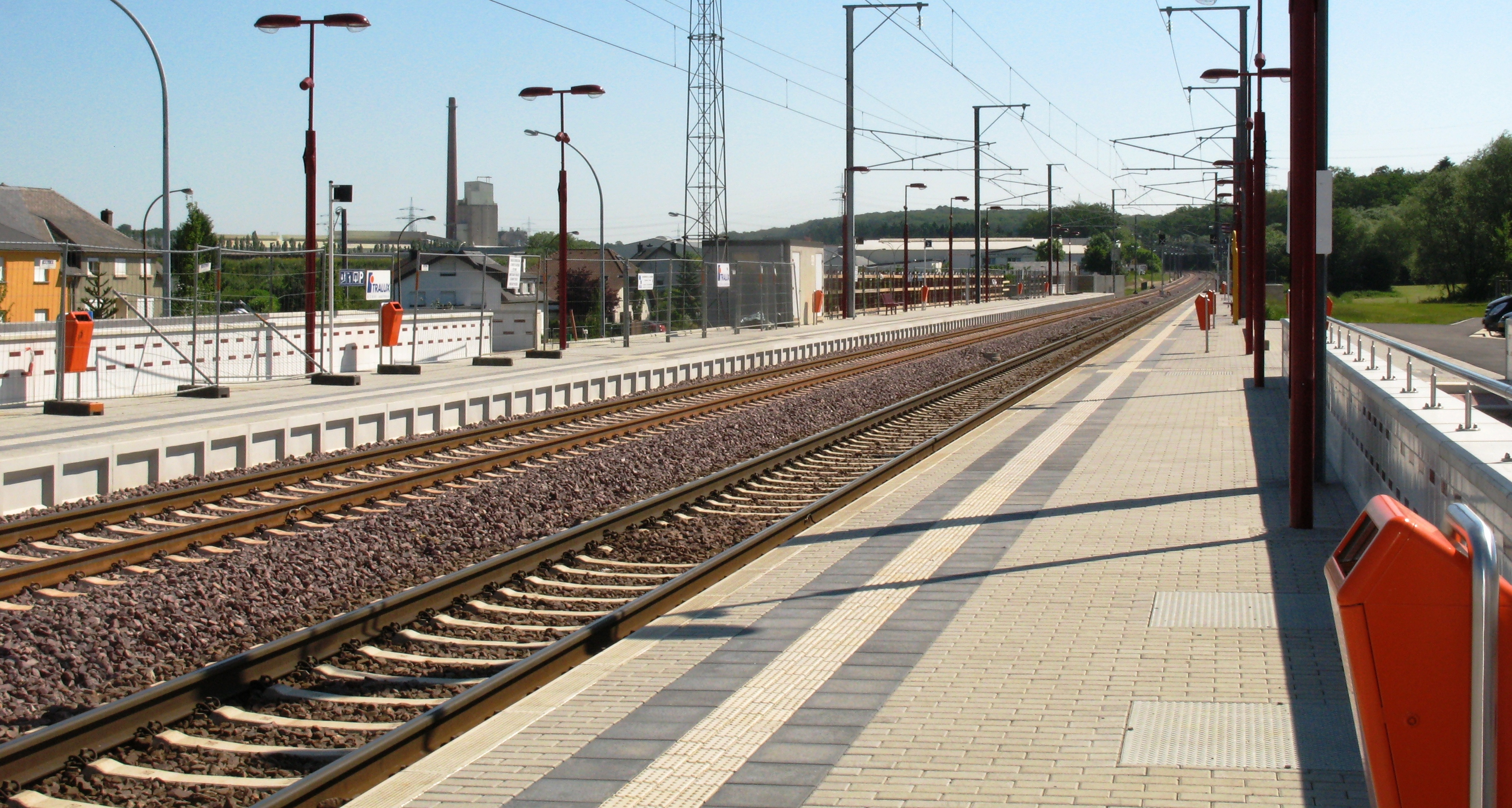
Bascharage-Sanem railway station

Bascharage-Sanem railway station (Note: Luxembourgish: Gare Nidderkäerjeng-Suessem [ˈɡaːʀ nidɐˌkɛːɐ̯ʒeŋ ˈzu̯əsəm], French: Gare de Bascharage-Sanem) is a railway station serving the towns of Bascharage and Sanem, in the south-west of Luxembourg. It is operated by Chemins de Fer Luxembourgeois, the state-owned railway company.

The station is situated on Line 70, which connects the south-west of the country to Luxembourg City.

== Situation ==
At 338 yards altitude, the Bascharage - Sanem railway station is located at kilometric point 17,000 of line 7 from Luxembourg to Pétange between the stations of Schouweiler and Pétange.

== History ==
The Bascharage station was opened on 8 September 1900 by the Imperial Railways in Alsace-Lorraine.

The old building for travelers was destroyed after 1981. The station was entirely rebuilt and a second track added in 2010.

== Passenger services ==
The station has no direct reception; however, it has several shelters and a parking lot.

CFL trains on line 70 (Regional-Express RE and Regionalbahn RB) between Luxembourg and Pétange or Rodange or Longwy stop at the station.

== Notes ==
Preceding station	CFL	Following station
Schouweiler towards Luxembourg	Line 70	Pétange towards Athus
Dippach-Reckange towards Luxembourg	Line 70	Pétange towards Longwy
