= Magdalena =

Magdalena may refer to:

- Magdalena (given name), a feminine given name derived from Mary Magdalene (including a list of persons with the name)

== Entertainment ==
- Magdalena (character), an American comic book superheroine
- Magdalena (film), a 1955 Mexican drama film
- Magdalena (Philippine TV series), a 2012 Philippine drama series
- Magdalena (Mexican TV series), Mexican telenovela
- Magdalena (novel), a Czech novel by Josef Svatopluk Machar

=== Music ===
- Magdalena: a Musical Adventure, a 1948 folk operetta by Heitor Villa-Lobos
- Magdalena, a 1983 album by Freddie Aguilar, or the title song
- "Magdalena", a song by Brandon Flowers from Flamingo, 2010
- "Magdalena", a song by David Gray from Sell, Sell, Sell, 1996
- "Magdalena", a song by dEUS from The Ideal Crash, 1999
- "Magdalena", a song by Donny Hathaway from Extension of a Man, 1973
- "Magdalena", a song by the Mothers of Invention from Just Another Band from L.A., 1972
- "Magdalena", a song by A Perfect Circle from Mer de Noms, 2000
- "Magdalena", a song by the Smashing Pumpkins from Atum: A Rock Opera in Three Acts, 2023
- "Magdalena", a song by Willie Nile from House of a Thousand Guitars, 2009
- "Magdalena", a song by Burt Bacharach & The Houston Symphony Orchestra from Woman, 1979
- Magdalena Bay, an American alternative pop duo from Miami, Florida, formed in 2016.

== Places ==
=== Argentina ===
- Magdalena, Buenos Aires, the district capital of Magdalena Partido in Buenos Aires Province
- Magdalena Partido, partido located in the north eastern part of Buenos Aires Province

=== Bolivia ===
- Magdalena, Beni, a municipal section

=== Chile ===
- Magdalena Channel, channel joining the Strait of Magellan with Cockburn Channel
- Magdalena Island, Aysén Region, island in southern Chile
- Magdalena Island, Magallanes Region, small island in the Strait of Magellan

=== Colombia ===
- Central Magdalena Province, a province in the Cundinamarca Department
- Lower Magdalena Province, a province in the Cundinamarca Department
- Magdalena Department, an administrative division (previously the State of Magdalena, during the United States of Colombia period)
- Magdalena Medio Antioquia, a subregion of the Antioquia Department
- Magdalena River, the principal river of Colombia
- Magdalena River Valley
- Upper Magdalena Province, a province in the Cundinamarca Department

=== Ecuador ===
- La Magdalena, Quito, an electoral parish
- La Magdalena metro station

=== Honduras ===
- Magdalena, Intibucá, a municipality

=== Mexico ===
- Magdalena Apasco
- Magdalena Bay, western coast of the Mexican state of Baja California Sur
- Magdalena Contreras, one of 16 boroughs into which Mexico's Federal District is divided
- Magdalena, Jalisco, municipality in the state of Jalisco, near Tequla
- Magdalena Jaltepec
- Magdalena de Kino, city in the state of Sonora
- Magdalena (municipality), whose seat is Magdalena de Kino
- Magdalena Municipality, Veracruz, municipality in Veracruz
- Isla Magdalena (Baja California Sur), island off the Pacific Ocean coast of the Mexican state of Baja California Sur

=== Peru ===
- Magdalena del Mar, district of the Lima Province in Peru
- Magdalena Vieja, ancient name of Pueblo Libre district in Lima Province in Peru
- Magdalena District, Cajamarca, district of the province Cajamarca in Peru
- Magdalena District, Chachapoyas, in the province of Chachapoyas, Peru

=== Philippines ===
- Magdalena, Laguna, a municipality

=== Slovenia ===
- Magdalena District, Maribor, a suburb of Maribor

=== Spain ===
- Magdalena Peninsula, peninsula along the north coast of Spain

=== Tobago ===
- Magdalena, the original name of the island of Tobago

=== United States ===
- Magdalena, New Mexico
- Magdalena Mountains, west-central New Mexico
- Magdalena National Forest, New Mexico

== Ships ==
- Magdalena, a 1871–1906 Norwegian seal catcher, better known as Danmark after 1906
- La Magdalena (ship), a 1508–1509 Spanish nao
- RMS Magdalena, a number of ships with this name
- SS Magdalena, a number of ships with this name

== Other uses ==
- La Magdalena, Jaén, a church in Andalucia, Spain
- Church of la Magdalena (Torrelaguna), a church in Spain
- Convento de la Magdalena, a former convent, now a hotel, near Antequera, Province of Málaga, Spain
- Palacio de la Magdalena, a palace in Santander, Cantabria, Spain
- Magdalena, a type of Spanish muffin
- 318 Magdalena, large Main belt asteroid
- Magdalena alpine, a member of the subfamily Satyrinae of the family Nymphalidae.

== See also ==
- Anna Magdalena, a 1998 Hong Kong film
- Magdalene (disambiguation)
- Maddalena (disambiguation)
