= CFL Line 80 =

Overview
- Owner: CFL
- Locale: Luxembourg, Belgium

Service
- Operator(s): CFL

Line 80 is a Luxembourgish railway line connecting Rodange to Belgium. It is designated Chemins de Fer Luxembourgeois, but predominantly operated by NMBS/SNCB. The services overlap with those designated as Line 70. On the Belgian side of the border the routes are numbered in the NMBS/SNCB series.

- Line 165 Libramont - Virton - Y Aubange - Athus
- Line 165/1 Y Aubange - Frontière RFNL (Rodange)
- Line 167 (Arlon) - Y. Autelbas - Athus - Frontière RFNL (Rodange)

The routes are all electrified at 25 kV using OHL cf NMBS/SNCB's normal 3 kV DC OHL. This requires NMBS/SNCB to use Class 41xx DMUs.

The following passenger services operate on the line, as of 2019:

- Arlon - MeAthus - Aubange - Virton - Libramont hourly on weekdays by SNCB/NMBS
- Luxembourg - Rodange - Athus 2 trains per hour every day (reduced on Sunday) by CFL
- Virton - Halanzy - Aubange - Rodange 2 pairs of trains in rush hours to connect to Longwy - Luxembourg services

== Stations ==
- Arlon (Belgium)
- Messancy (Belgium)
- Athus (Belgium)
- Rodange
- Aubange (Belgium)
- Halanzy (Belgium)
- Virton (Belgium)
