= Madeline (disambiguation) =

Madeline is a media franchise based on a series of children's books written by Ludwig Bemelmans. The name is a variant of Madeleine.

Madeline may also refer to:

== Arts and entertainment ==
- Madeline (book series), by Ludwig Bemelmans and later John Bemelmans–Marciano
- Madeline (book), the first book in the series
- Madeline, a 1952 film nominated for the Academy Award for Best Animated Short Film, based on the book
- Madeline (1998 film), a live-action adaptation of Bemelmans' series
- Madeline (TV series), an American series that aired in three seasons (1993, 1995, 2000)
- Madeline (video game series), educational video games
- Madeline (Celeste), fictional character

== Music ==
- Madeline (musician), American folk singer-songwriter
- Madeline (album), by Tickle Me Pink
- "Madeline" (Zach Bryan song), featuring Gabriella Rose
- "Madeline" (Lily Allen song)
- "Madeline", a song by Hanson on the album Middle of Nowhere
- "Madeline", a song by Yo La Tengo on the album And Then Nothing Turned Itself Inside-Out

== Places ==
- Madeline, California, an unincorporated community in the United States
- Madeline, West Virginia, an unincorporated community in the United States
- Madeline Island, off the U.S. state of Wisconsin
- Mount Madeline, a mountain in New Zealand

== Other uses ==
- Tropical Storm Madeline, seven tropical cyclones in the eastern Pacific Ocean
- 2569 Madeline, an asteroid

== See also ==
- Maddy (disambiguation)
- Madeleine (name), includes a list of people and fictional characters named Madeleine or Madeline
- Madeleine (disambiguation)
- Magdalene (disambiguation)
- Madaline (disambiguation)
