= Hollerich railway station =

Railway station in Luxembourg

Coordinates: 49°35′42″N 06°07′24″E

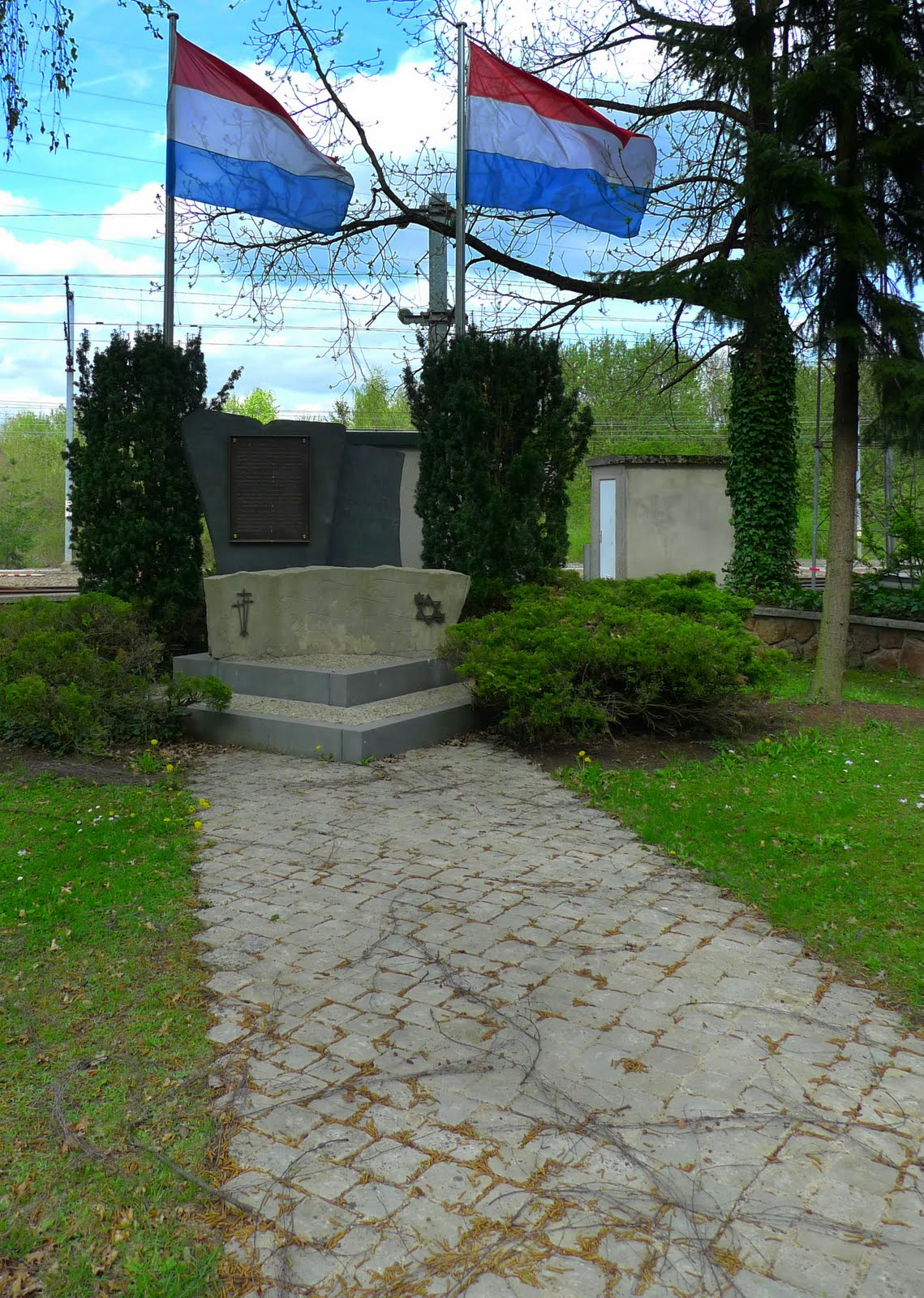
The deportation memorial at Hollerich station

Hollerich railway station (Luxembourgish: Gare Hollerech, French: Gare de Hollerich, German: Bahnhof Hollerich) is a railway station serving Hollerich, a district in the south-west of Luxembourg City, in southern Luxembourg. It is operated by Chemins de Fer Luxembourgeois, the state-owned railway company.

The station is situated on Line 70, which connects Luxembourg City to the south-west of the country. It is the first stop south-west of the country's main terminus, Luxembourg railway station, which is located only 0.6 kilometres (0.37 mi) to the north-east.

Located at the station is the Luxembourg memorial to the deportations during the German occupation of Luxembourg in World War II. Just under 700 Jews were deported from Luxembourg.

Preceding station	CFL	Following station
Luxembourg Terminus	Line 70	Leudelange towards Athus
Luxembourg Terminus	Line 70	Dippach-Reckange towards Longwy
