= Leudelange railway station =

Railway station in Luxembourg

Coordinates: 49°35′07″N 06°03′19″E

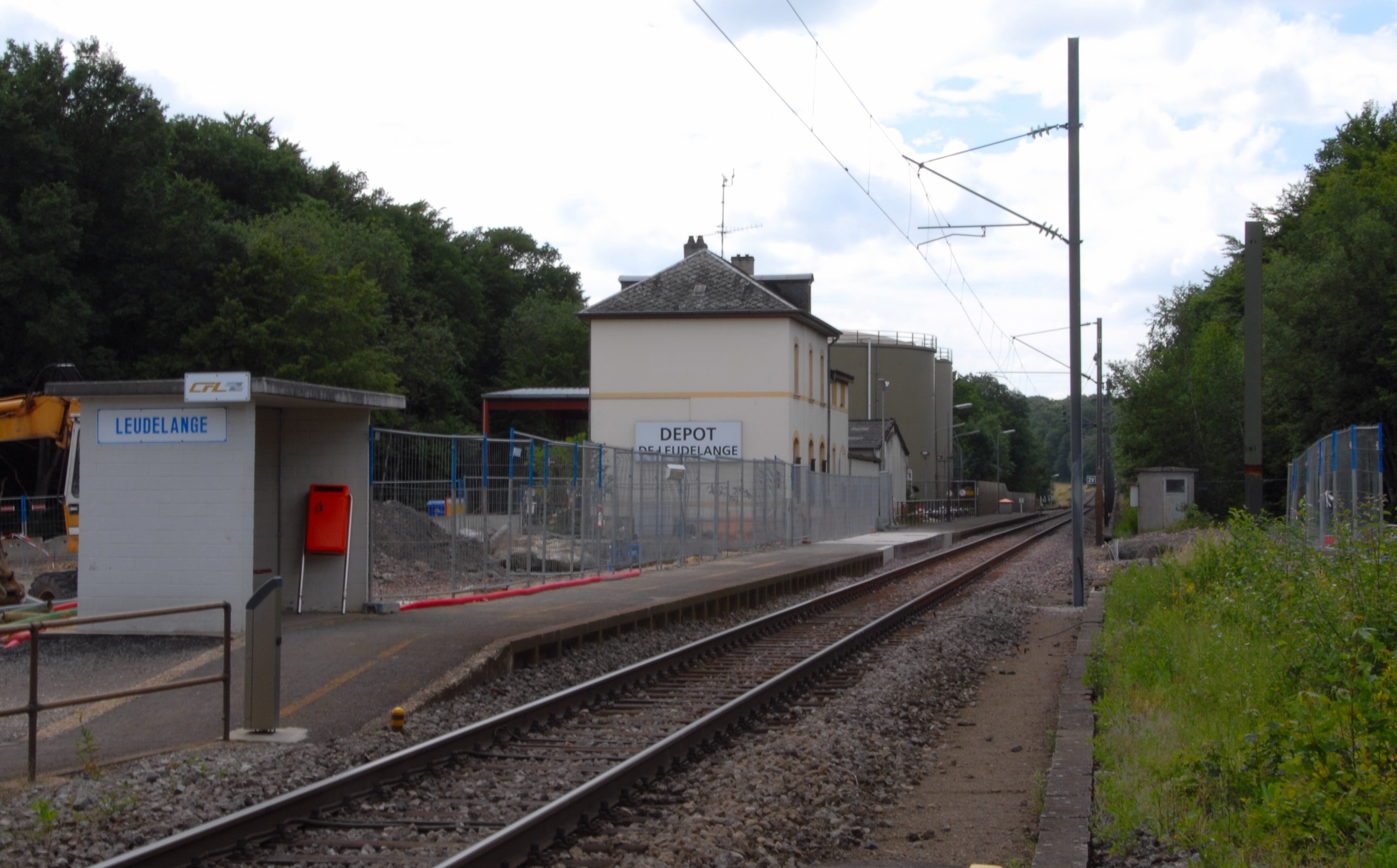
Leudelange railway station

Leudelange railway station (Luxembourgish: Gare Leideleng, French: Gare de Leudelange, German: Bahnhof Leudelingen) is a railway station serving Leudelange, in south-western Luxembourg. It is operated by Chemins de Fer Luxembourgeois, the state-owned railway company.

The station is situated on Line 70, which connects the south-west of the country to Luxembourg City.

| Preceding station | CFL | Following station |
|---|---|---|
| Hollerich towards Luxembourg | Line 70 | Dippach-Reckange towards Athus |
