= Madeline Lee =

Madeline Lee or Madeleine Lee may refer to:

- Madeline Lee (actress) (1923–2008), American performer, producer and social activist; married to Jack Gilford
- Madeleine Lee (Neighbours), a character appearing from April 2004 to January 2005
- Madeline Lee (opera), a 2004 one-act opera by Australian composer John Haddock
- Madeleine Lee (writer) (born 1962), Singaporean poet and investment manager
- Marie Madeleine Lee (1932–2026), Mauritian politician and diplomat
- Mrs. Lightfoot Lee, the main character of Henry Adams' Democracy: An American Novel (1880)

== See also ==
- Madeline (disambiguation)
