= Schouweiler railway station =

Railway station in Luxembourg

Coordinates: 49°34′26″N 05°57′40″E

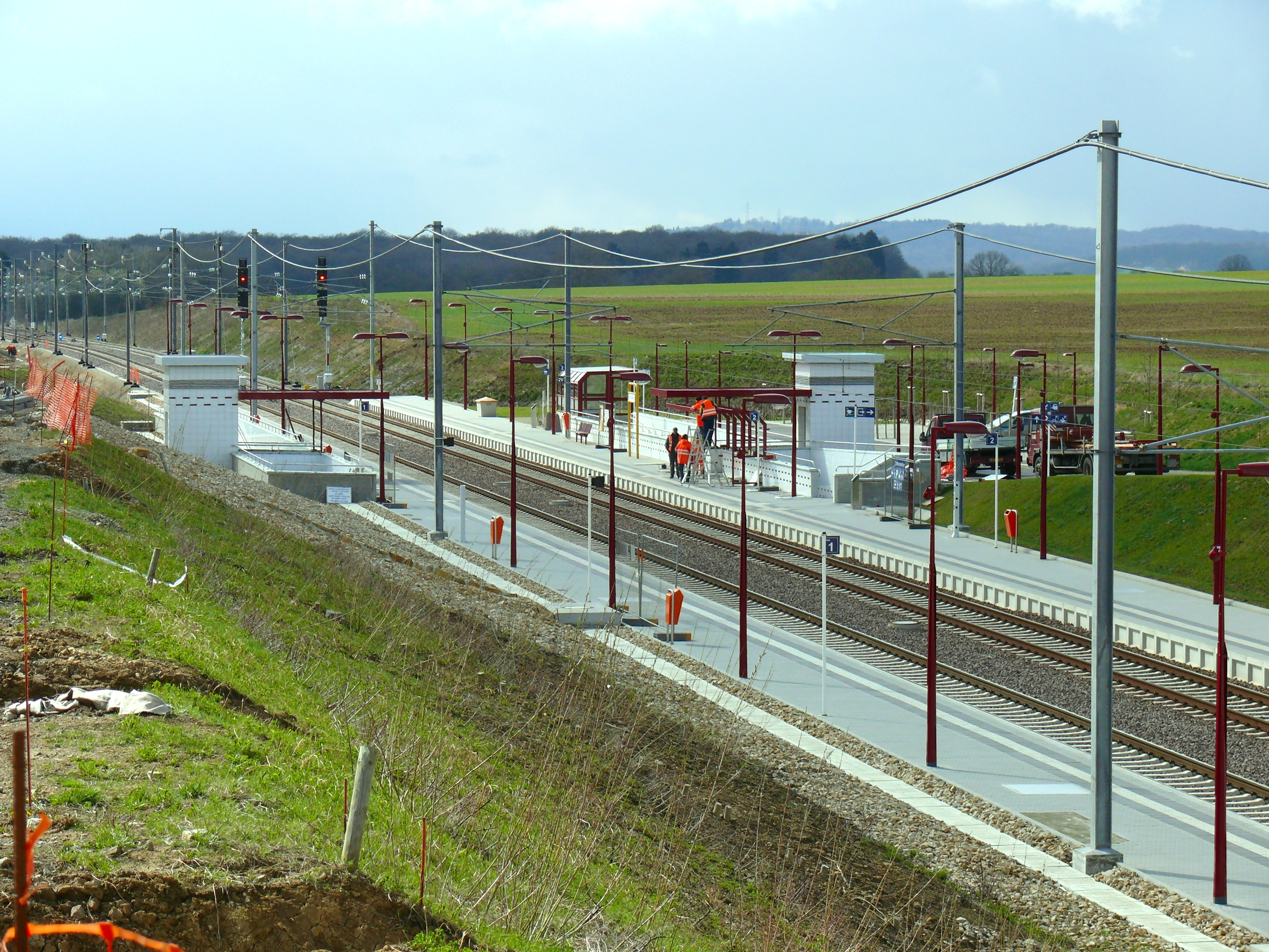
Schouweiller railway in 2010

Schouweiler railway station (Luxembourgish: Gare Schuller, French: Gare de Schouweiler, German: Bahnhof Schouweiler) is a railway station serving Schouweiler, in the commune of Dippach, in south-western Luxembourg. It is operated by Chemins de Fer Luxembourgeois, the state-owned railway company.

The station is situated on Line 70, which connects the south-west of the country to Luxembourg City.

Preceding station	CFL	Following station
Dippach-Reckange towards Luxembourg	Line 70	Bascharage-Sanem towards Athus
