= Madelaine =

Madelaine is a feminine given name. It is a variation of the name Madeleine. It is also a surname.

== Individuals with the given name ==
- Madelaine Edlund, Swedish footballer
- Madelaine Newton, British actress
- Madelaine Petsch, American actress

== Individuals with the surname ==
- Matthieu Madelaine (born 1983), French swimmer
- Louis Philipon de La Madelaine, (1734 – 1818), French writer, chansonnier, philologist and goguettier

== See also ==
- La Madelaine-sous-Montreuil, a commune in the Pas-de-Calais département, France
- Raisin de la Madelaine, a variety of wine grape
- Lamadelaine, a town in the commune of Pétange, Luxembourg
  - Lamadelaine railway station
- "Boulevard De La Madelaine", a song by Moody Blues on the album An Introduction to The Moody Blues
- Madeleine (disambiguation)
