= Maddalena =

Maddalena is an Italian female given name derived from Saint Mary Magdalene. It may refer to:

== Churches ==
- Santa Maria Maddalena in Rome
- La Maddalena, Venice

== Localities ==
- La Maddalena, a commune in Sardinia, Italy
- Maddalena (Genoa), a neighborhood in Genoa, Italy
- Maddalena Archipelago, a group of islands in the Strait of Bonifacio
- Maddalena Pass, a pass in the Alps
- Monte Maddalena, a mountain in Lombardy, Italy

== People ==
- Maddalena Aceiaiuoli (1557–1610), Tuscan noblewoman and poet
- Maddalena Allegranti (1754–1829), Italian opera singer
- Maddalena di Canossa (1774–1835), Italian foundress of the two Canossian orders
- Maddalena Cerasuolo (1920–1999), Italian antifascist partisan
- Maddalena Musumeci (born 1976), Italian water polo player
- Master of the Maddalena (fl. 13th century), unnamed Florentine artist
- Maddalena, the assistant to anthropologist Charles Godfrey Leland
- Giovanni Maddalena, Professor of theoretical philosophy at University of Molise
- Jack Della Maddalena, Australian Mixed Martial Artist
- Julie Maddalena, American voice actress
- Marianne Maddalena (born 1963), American Film producer

== Film, fiction and music ==
- Maddalena (1954 film), a 1954 Italian film directed by Augusto Genina
- La Maddalena (2014 film) a 2014 Italian film
- Maddalena (opera), a one-act opera composed by Sergei Prokofiev
- Maddalena (1971 film), directed by Jerzy Kawalerowicz

== Other uses ==
- Maddalena lunatic asylum, a 19th-century "insane asylum" in Aversa, near Naples, Italy

== See also ==
- Maria Maddalena (disambiguation)
- Madeleine (disambiguation)
- Magdalene (disambiguation)
- Magdalena (disambiguation)
- Santa Maddalena Foundation, a writers' retreat in Tuscany, Italy
- Santa Maria Maddalena (disambiguation)
