= Pétange railway station =

Railway station in Luxembourg

Coordinates: 49°33′14″N 05°52′40″E

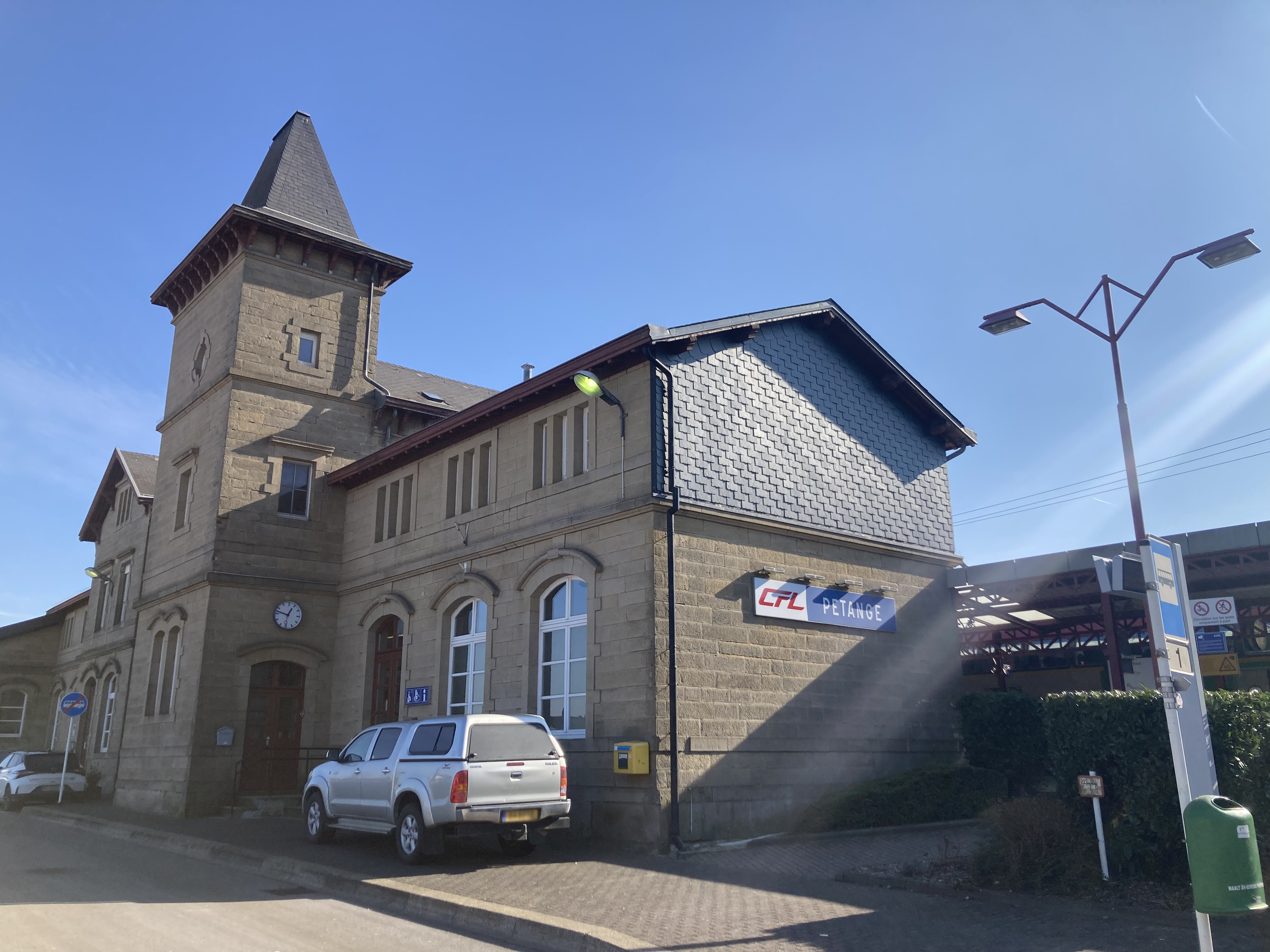
The station in 2025.

Pétange railway station (Luxembourgish: Gare Péiteng, French: Gare de Pétange, German: Bahnhof Petingen) is a railway station serving Pétange, in south-western Luxembourg. It is operated by Chemins de Fer Luxembourgeois, the state-owned railway company.

The station is the main terminus of Line 60, which connects Luxembourg City to the Red Lands of the south of the country. It is also located on Line 70, which connects Luxembourg City to the south-west, continuing to Athus in Belgium and Longwy in France.

The station was created as the main hub of the Prince Henri Railway. Adjacent to the CFL station is a platform served by Train 1900. From here the line runs up the hill to Fond-de-Gras. It originally served the region's iron mines.

As of 2022, it was the fifth-busiest station in Luxembourg, with 1.7 million passengers that year.

From 1873 until 1969, Pétange was the terminus of the Attert Line (Ligne d'Attert) which provided a direct connection to Ettelbruck.

| Preceding station | CFL | Following station |
|---|---|---|
| Niederkorn towards Luxembourg | Line 60 | Lamadelaine towards Rodange |
| Bascharage-Sanem towards Luxembourg | Line 70 | Lamadelaine towards Athus |
| Bascharage-Sanem towards Luxembourg | Line 70 | Rodange towards Longwy |
