= Madeleine =

Madeleine or La Madeleine may refer to:

== Common meanings ==
- Madeleine (given name), also Madeline, a feminine given name, includes a list of people and fictional characters
- Madeleine (cake), a traditional sweet cake from France
  - English madeleine, a tea cake common in the UK

== Christianity ==
- Mary Magdalene, also called the Madeleine, a follower of Jesus
- La Madeleine, Paris (Église de la Madeleine), a church in Paris
- Église de la Madeleine (Besançon), Doube département, France, a church
- Cathedral of the Madeleine, Salt Lake City, Utah, United States, a Roman Catholic cathedral

== Arts and entertainment ==
- Madelein (1919 film), a German silent film
- Madeleine (1950 film), directed by David Lean
- Madeleine (2003 film), a South Korean romance
- Madeleine (2023 film), a Canadian animated short film
- Madeleine (opera), a 1914 one-act opera by Victor Herbert
- "Madeleine" (Backstreet Boys song), a track of In a World Like This
- "Madeleine", a song by Jonathan Kelly, released in 1972
- "Madeleine", a song by Jacques Brel
- Madeleine: One of Love's Jansenists, a 1919 novel by Hope Mirrlees
- "Madeleine", an episode of Bel Ami

== Places ==
=== France ===
- La Madeleine (Laneuville-devant-Nancy), a former commune
- La Madeleine, Manche, a village in Normandy
- La Madeleine, Nord, a town in the Nord département
- La Madeleine, a parish in Faycelles in the Lot département; see Liberty Tree
- La Madeleine, a village in Guérande in the Loire-Atlantique département
- Madeleine (river), in eastern France
- Col de la Madeleine, a high mountain pass in the Alps in the department of Savoie in France
- Madeleine cemetery (Cimetière de la Madeleine), Paris, a former cemetery
- Cimetière de la Madeleine, a cemetery in the Saint-Maurice quarter of Amiens, France
- Abri de la Madeleine, cave in Tursac, Dordogne
  - Magdalenian, anthropological and culture period named after this cave
- Quartier de la Madeleine, in Paris

=== Elsewhere ===
- Magdalen Islands (French: Îles de la Madeleine), a group of islands in the Gulf of St. Laurence, Quebec, Canada
- Îles de la Madeleine (Senegal), uninhabited islands and a national park off the shore of Dakar

== Transportation ==
- Boulevard de la Madeleine, one of the four 'grands boulevards' in Paris
- Madeleine station, a Paris Metro station
- MS Madeleine, a 1981 car ferry operating in Canada

== Other uses ==
- Château de la Madeleine, a castle in the town of Chevreuse, in the département of Yvelines, France
- La Madeleine (restaurant chain), a U.S.-based restaurant chain
- Madeleine (book), a book by Jean Overton Fuller, the codename of Noor Inayat Khan (1914–1944), World War II Allied agent in Nazi-occupied France
- Alexandra Madeleine, Seychellois judge
- Madeleine: An Autobiography, the 1919 book by American sex-worker Madeleine Blair
- Madeleine, pen name of Anne-Marie Huguenin (1875–1943), Canadian journalist
- Madeleine, an object persistence layer written in the Ruby programming language—see System prevalence

== See also ==
- La Madeleine-de-Nonancourt, in the Eure département
- La Madeleine-Villefrouin, in the Loir-et-Cher département
- La Madeleine-Bouvet, in the Orne département
- La Madeleine-sur-Loing, in the Seine-et-Marne département
- Madelaine
- Lamadelaine, a town in the commune of Pétange (Luxembourg)
  - Lamadelaine railway station
- Madaline (disambiguation)
- Madeline (disambiguation)
- Magdalene (disambiguation)
