= Rodange railway station =

Railway station in Luxembourg

Coordinates: 49°33′03″N 05°50′36″E

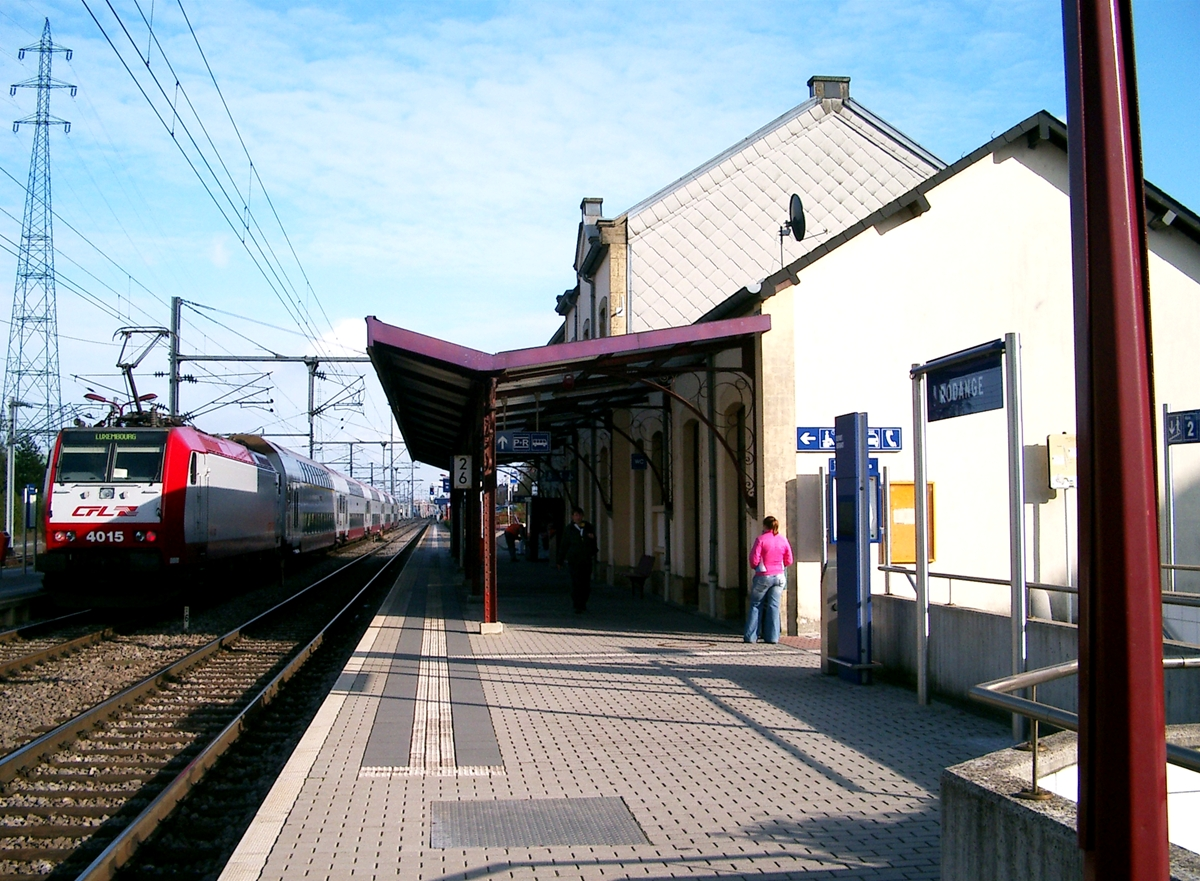
Rodange train station

Rodange railway station (Luxembourgish: Gare Rodange, French: Gare de Rodange, German: Bahnhof Rodingen) is a railway station serving Rodange, in the commune of Pétange, in south-western Luxembourg. It is operated by Chemins de Fer Luxembourgeois, the state-owned railway company.

The station is situated on Line 70, which connects the south-west of the country to Luxembourg City via Dippach-Reckange; at Rodange, the line branches, and connects to both the Belgian town of Athus and the French town of Longwy. It is also the terminus of Line 60, which connects Rodange with Luxembourg City via Esch-sur-Alzette.

Preceding station	CFL	Following station
Lamadelaine towards Luxembourg	Line 60	Terminus
Lamadelaine towards Luxembourg	Line 70	Athus Terminus
Pétange towards Luxembourg	Line 70	Longwy Terminus
