= Lamadelaine railway station =

Railway station in Luxembourg

Coordinates: 49°33′12″N 05°51′39″E

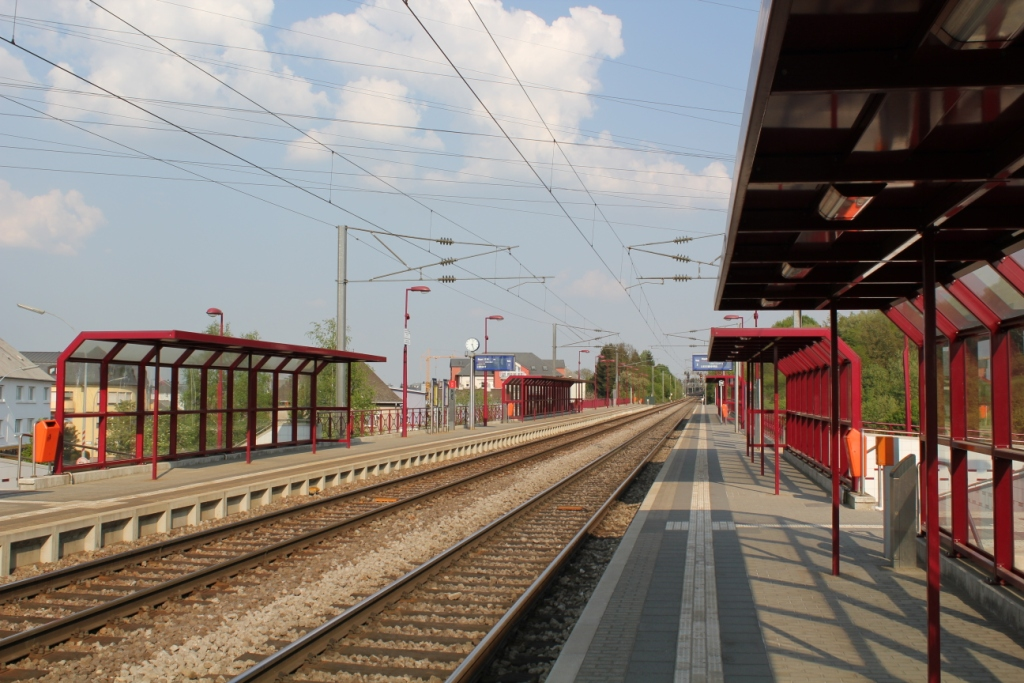
Lamadelaine railway station

Lamadelaine railway station (Luxembourgish: Gare Rolléng, French: Gare de Lamadelaine, German: Bahnhof Rollingen) is a railway station serving Lamadelaine, in the commune of Pétange, in south-western Luxembourg. It is operated by Chemins de Fer Luxembourgeois, the state-owned railway company.

The station is situated on Line 70, which connects the south-west of the country to Luxembourg City.

Preceding station	CFL	Following station
Pétange towards Luxembourg	Line 60	Rodange Terminus
Pétange towards Luxembourg	Line 70	Rodange towards Athus
