= Dippach-Reckange railway station =

Railway station in Luxembourg

Coordinates: 49°34′22″N 05°59′37″E

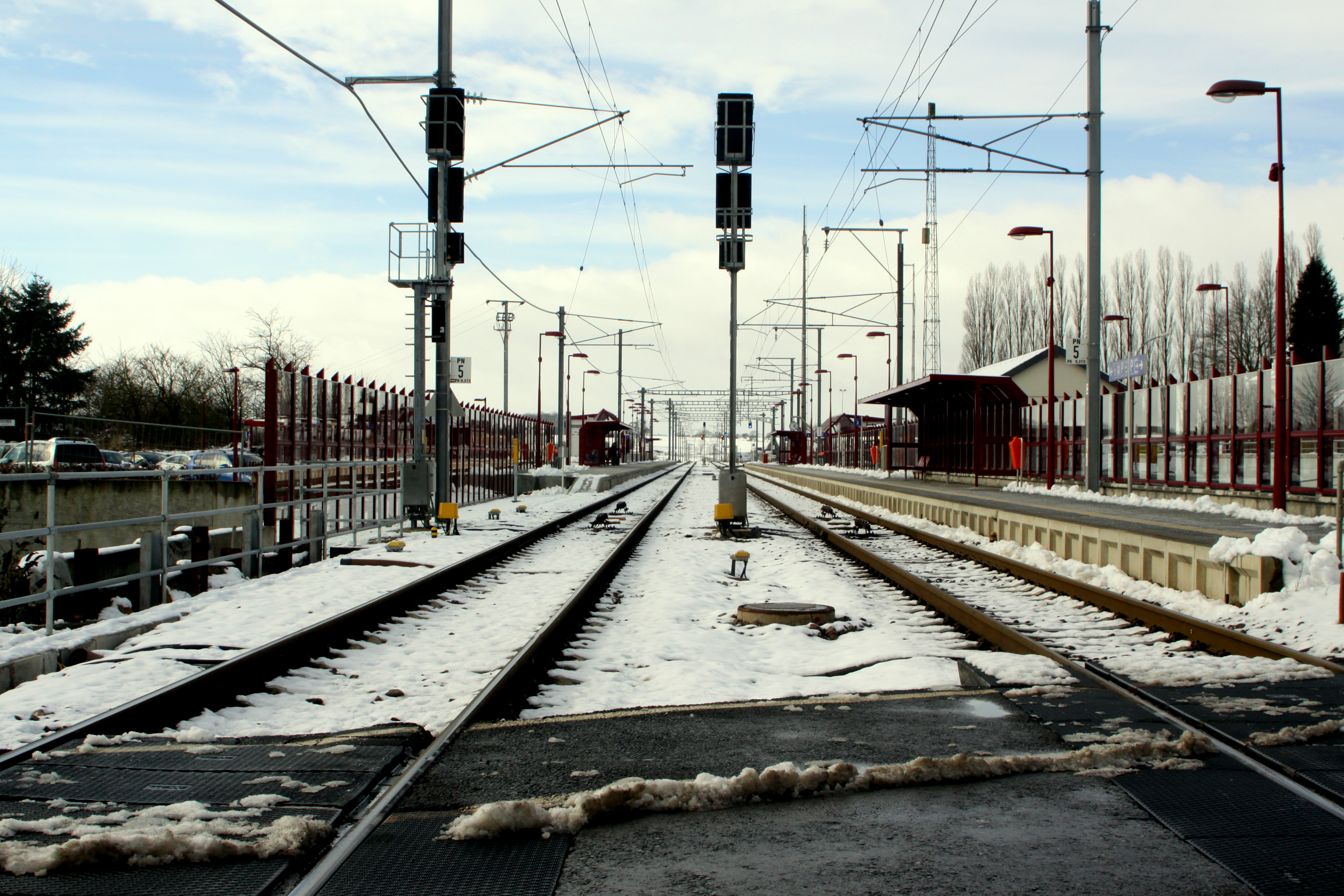
Dippach railway

Dippach-Reckange railway station (Luxembourgish: Gare Dippech-Reckeng, French: Gare de Dippach-Reckange, German: Bahnhof Dippach-Reckingen) is a railway station serving the town of Bettange-sur-Mess, in south-western Luxembourg. It is named after the nearby towns of Dippach and Reckange-sur-Mess, which lie to the north-west and south-east of Bettange respectively. It is operated by Chemins de Fer Luxembourgeois, the state-owned railway company.

The station is situated on Line 70, which connects the south-west of the country to Luxembourg City.

Preceding station	CFL	Following station
Leudelange towards Luxembourg	Line 70	Schouweiler towards Athus
Hollerich towards Luxembourg	Line 70	Bascharage-Sanem towards Longwy
