= CFL Line 70 =

Railway line in Luxembourg

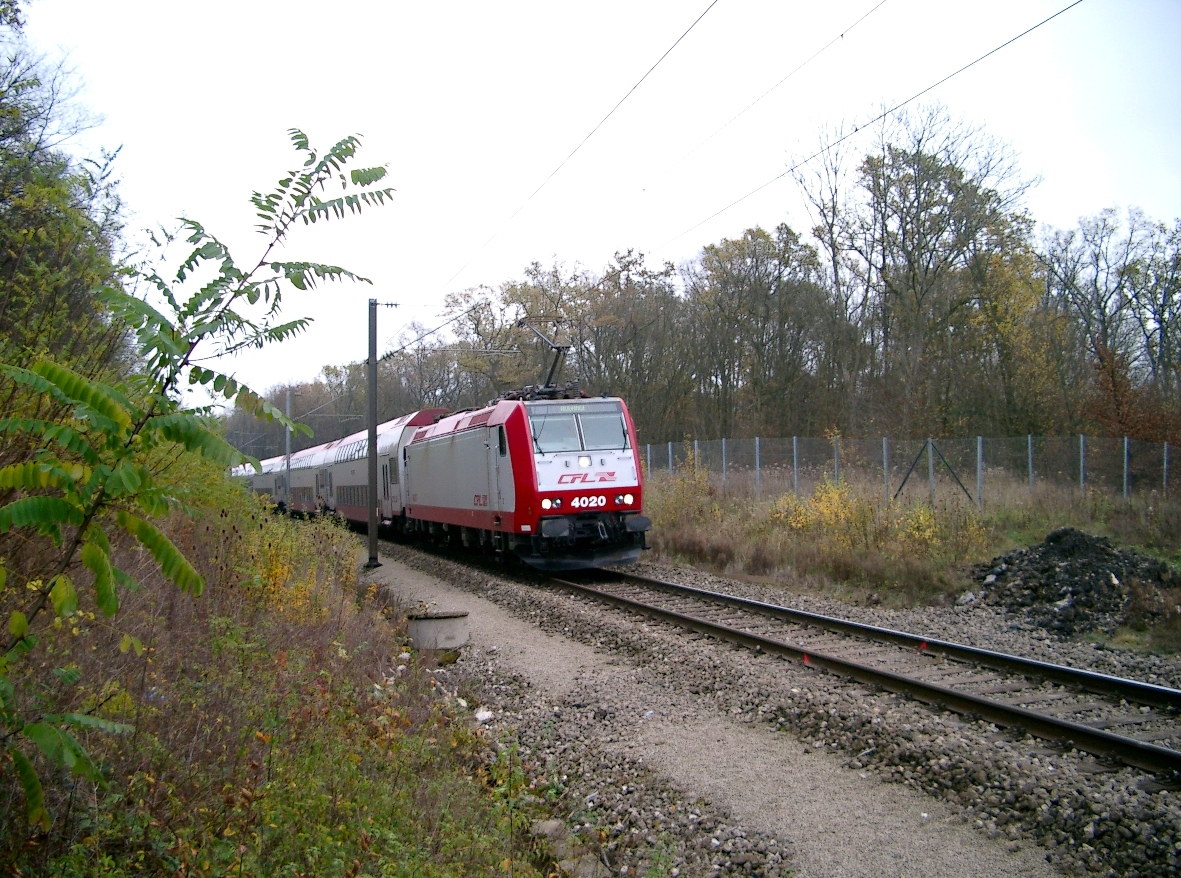
- Train on the line in 2005

Overview
- Owner: CFL
- Locale: Luxembourg, France, Belgium
- Termini: Luxembourg City; Longuyon, Athus

Service
- Operator(s): CFL, SNCF

Line 70 is a railway line connecting Luxembourg City to the south-west of Luxembourg, and on to Belgium and France. The terminus at the north-eastern end is Luxembourg railway station, whilst the terminals at the south are the French town of Longuyon and the Belgian town of Athus. It is designated, and predominantly operated, by Chemins de Fer Luxembourgeois. In the 2010s, former line 80 was merged with Line 70 in order to link Thionville and Longwy via Esch-sur-Alzette.

== Stations ==
- Luxembourg
- Hollerich
- Leudelange
- Dippach-Reckange
- Schouweiler
- Bascharage-Sanem
- Pétange
- Lamadelaine
- Rodange
  - Athus (Belgium)
    - Messancy (Belgium)
    - Arlon (Belgium)
  - Aubange (Belgium)
  - Halanzy (Belgium)
  - Virton (Belgium)
  - Bertrix (Belgium)
  - Libramont (Belgium)
- Longwy (France)
- Longuyon (France)

== Former line 80 ==
This former line, now part of the line 70, is designated Chemins de Fer Luxembourgeois, but predominantly operated by NMBS/SNCB. On the Belgian side of the border the routes are numbered in the NMBS/SNCB series.

- Line 165 Libramont - Virton - Y Aubange - Athus
- Line 165/1 Y Aubange - Frontière RFNL (Rodange)
- Line 167 (Arlon) - Y. Autelbas - Athus - Frontière RFNL (Rodange)

The routes are all electrified at 25 kV using OHL cf NMBS/SNCB's normal 3 kV DC OHL. This requires NMBS/SNCB to use Class 41xx DMUs.
