= Jean-Baptiste Pigalle =

French sculptor (1714–1785)

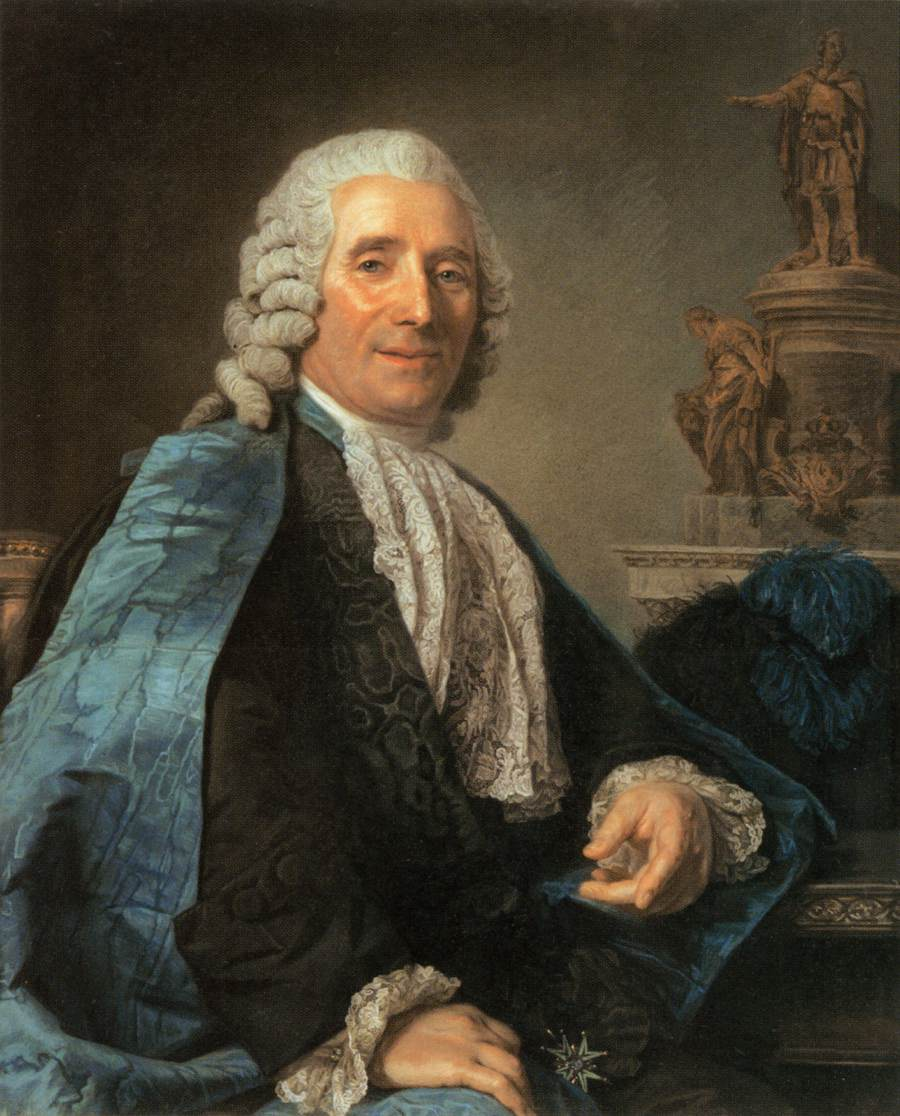
- Portrait by Marie-Suzanne Roslin, 1770
- Born: 26 January 1714; Rueil-Malmaison, France
- Died: 20 August 1785 (aged 71); Paris, France
- Known for: Sculpture
- Movement: Baroque, Neo-classicism

Jean-Baptiste Pigalle (French pronunciation: [ʒɑ̃ batist piɡal]; 26 January 1714 – 20 August 1785) was a French sculptor whose work was influenced by both baroque and neo-classical trends.

== Life ==
Pigalle was born in Paris, the seventh child of a carpenter. Although he failed to obtain the Prix de Rome, after a severe struggle he entered the Académie Royale and became one of the most popular sculptors of his day. His earlier work, such as Child with Cage (model at Sèvres) and Mercury Fastening his Sandals (Berlin, and lead cast in Louvre), is less commonplace than that of his more mature years, but his nude statue of Voltaire, dated 1776 (initially in the Institut de France, purchased by the Louvre in 1962), and his tombs of Comte d'Harcourt (c. 1764) (Notre-Dame de Paris) and of Marshal Saxe, completed in 1777 (Saint-Thomas Lutheran church, Strasbourg), are good examples of French sculpture in the 18th century.

Pigalle taught the sculptor Louis-Philippe Mouchy, who married his niece, and who closely copied Pigalle's style. He is also said to have taught the painter Madeleine-Élisabeth Pigalle, believed to be a distant relative from Sens. His name is most commonly known today because of the Pigalle red-light district in Paris, located around the square of the same name, Place Pigalle.

Pigalle died in Paris on 20 August 1785.

An estimated two thirds of his works (about 30 artworks) - considered a transition from Ancien to Nouveau Régime - were lost or destroyed.

== Monumental works ==
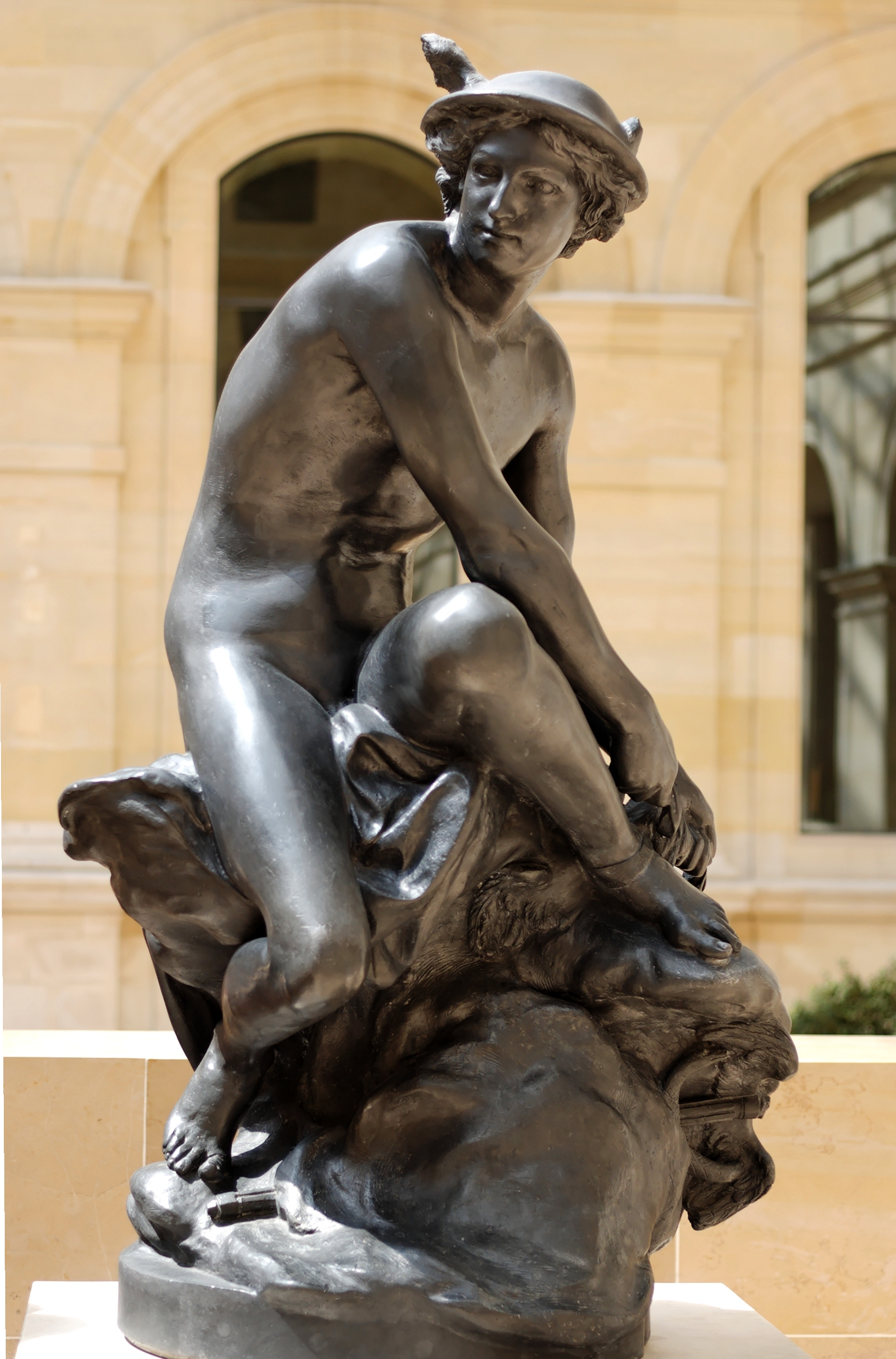
Mercury putting on his running shoes (Louvre) (1753)

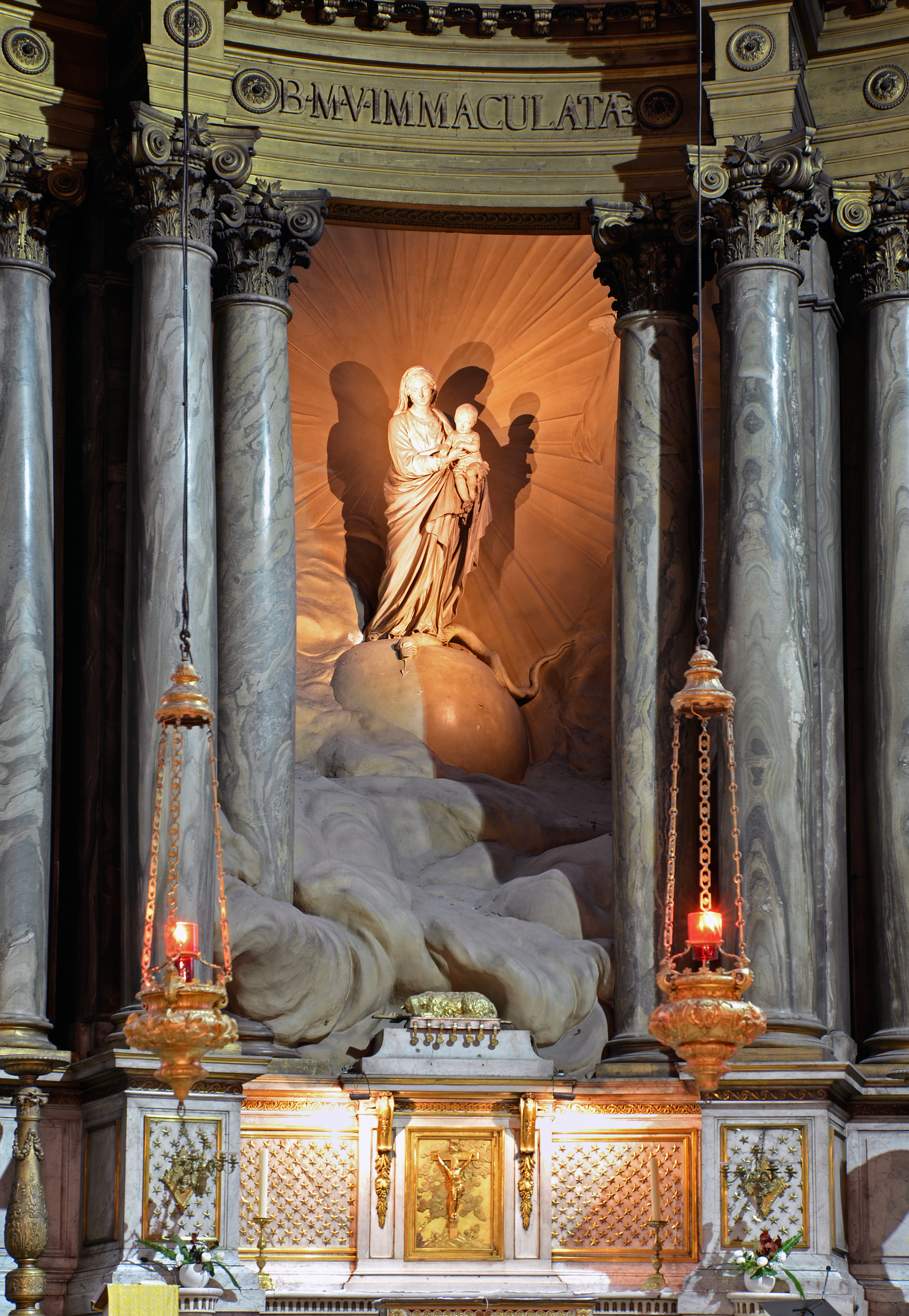
Chapel of the Virgin, Church of Saint-Sulpice, Paris

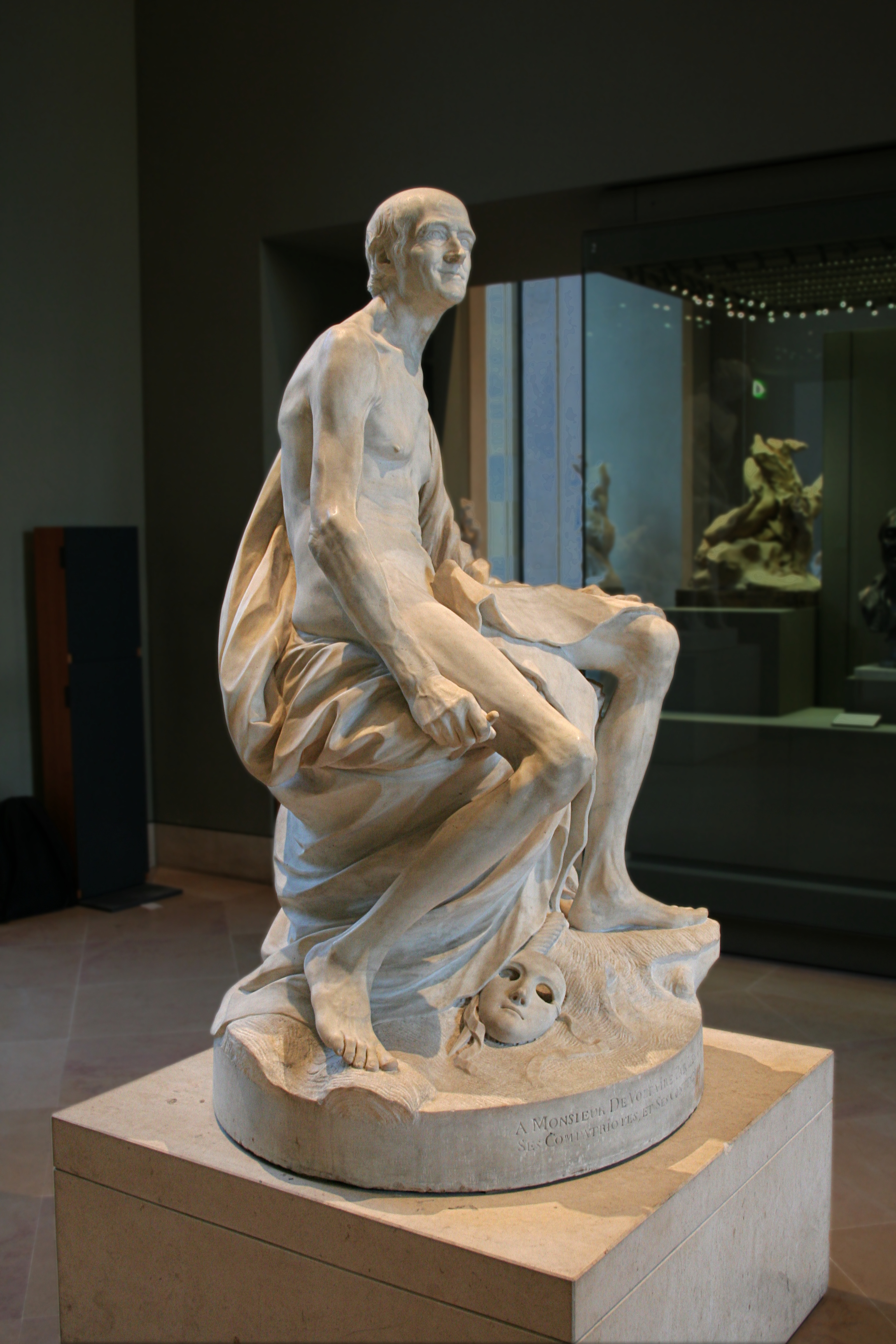
Voltaire nude (The Louvre, 1777)

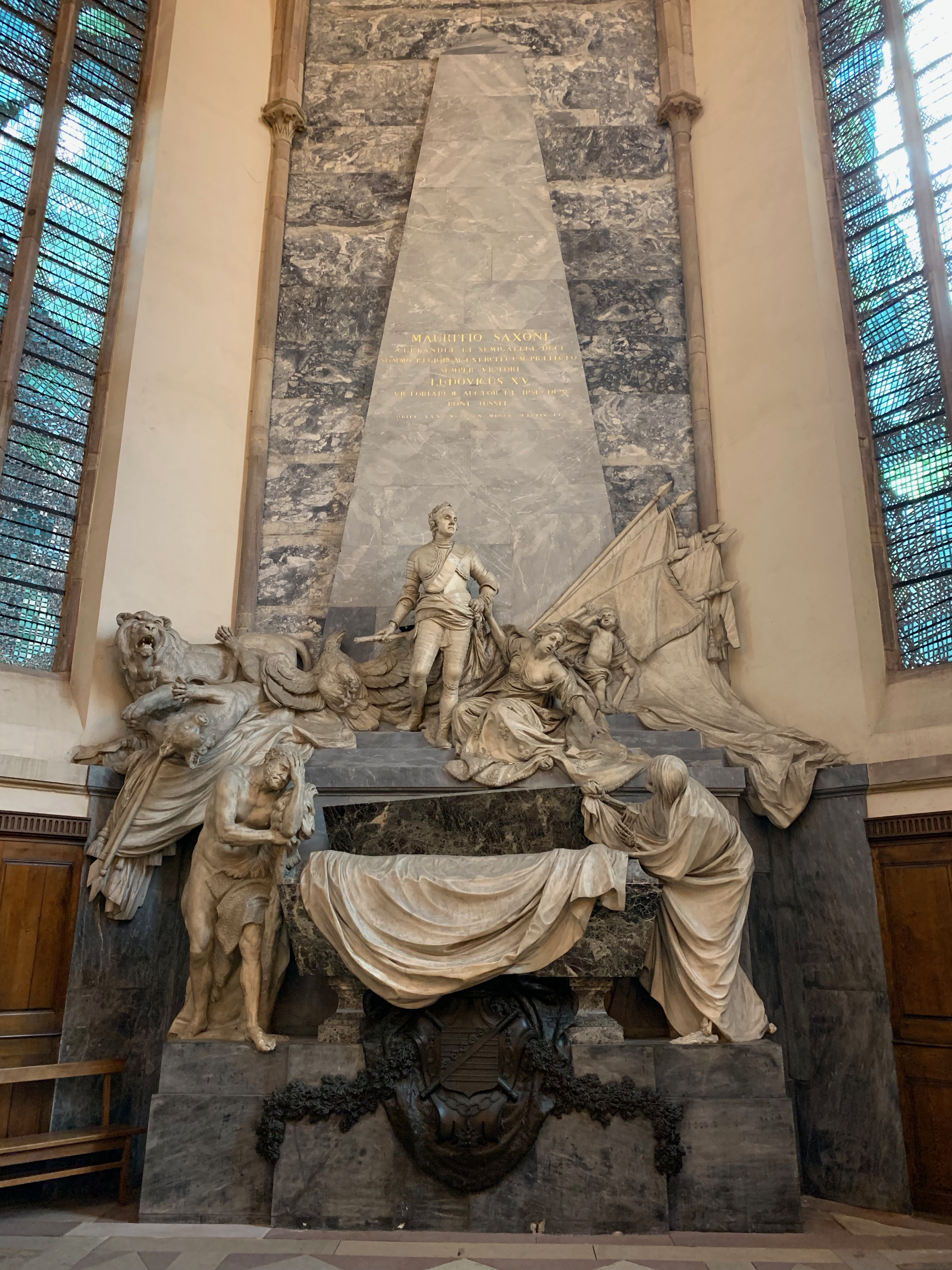
Funerary monument of Maurice de Saxe in Saint Thomas Church, Strasbourg

== Busts ==
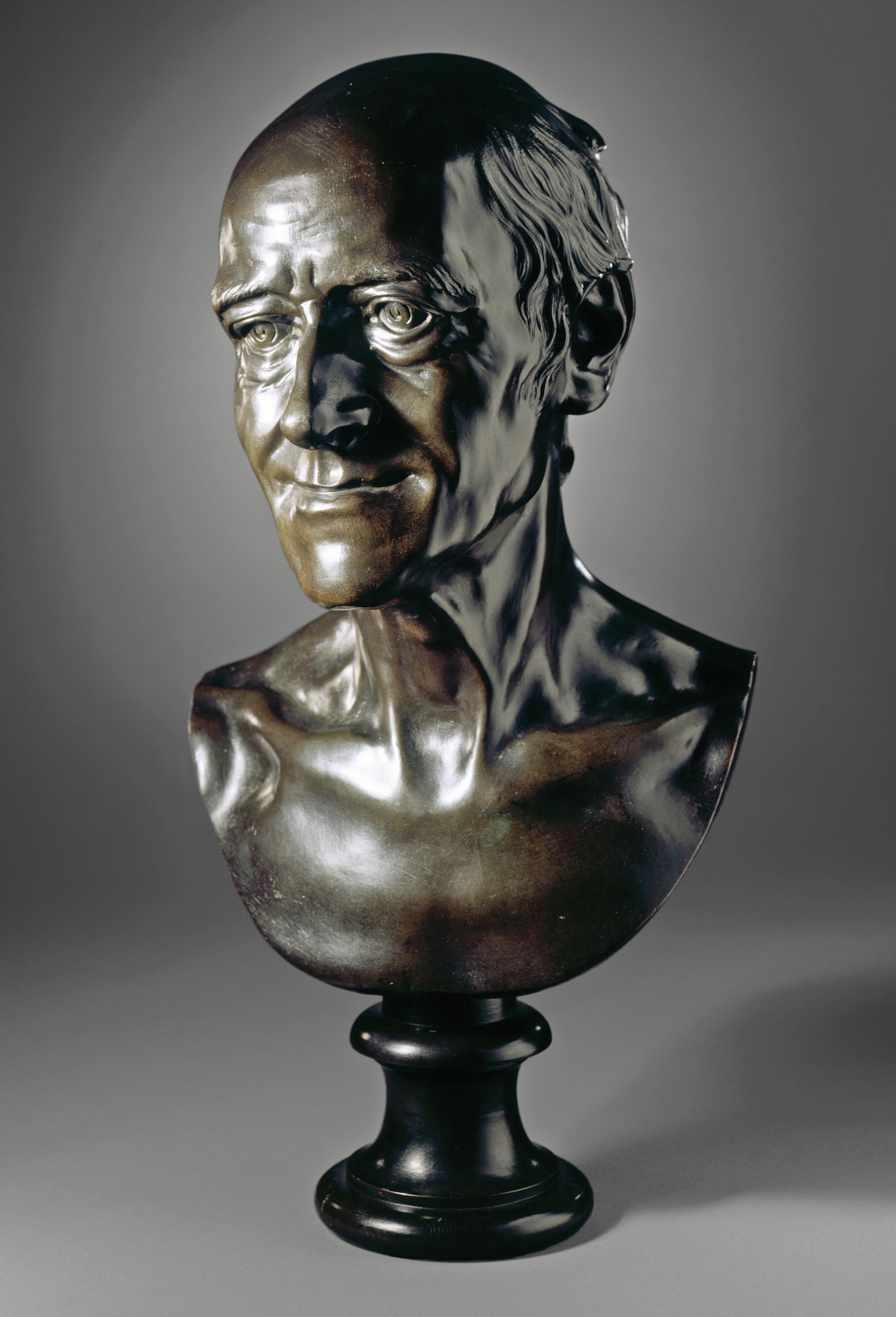
Portrait of Voltaire (Los Angeles County Museum of Art)

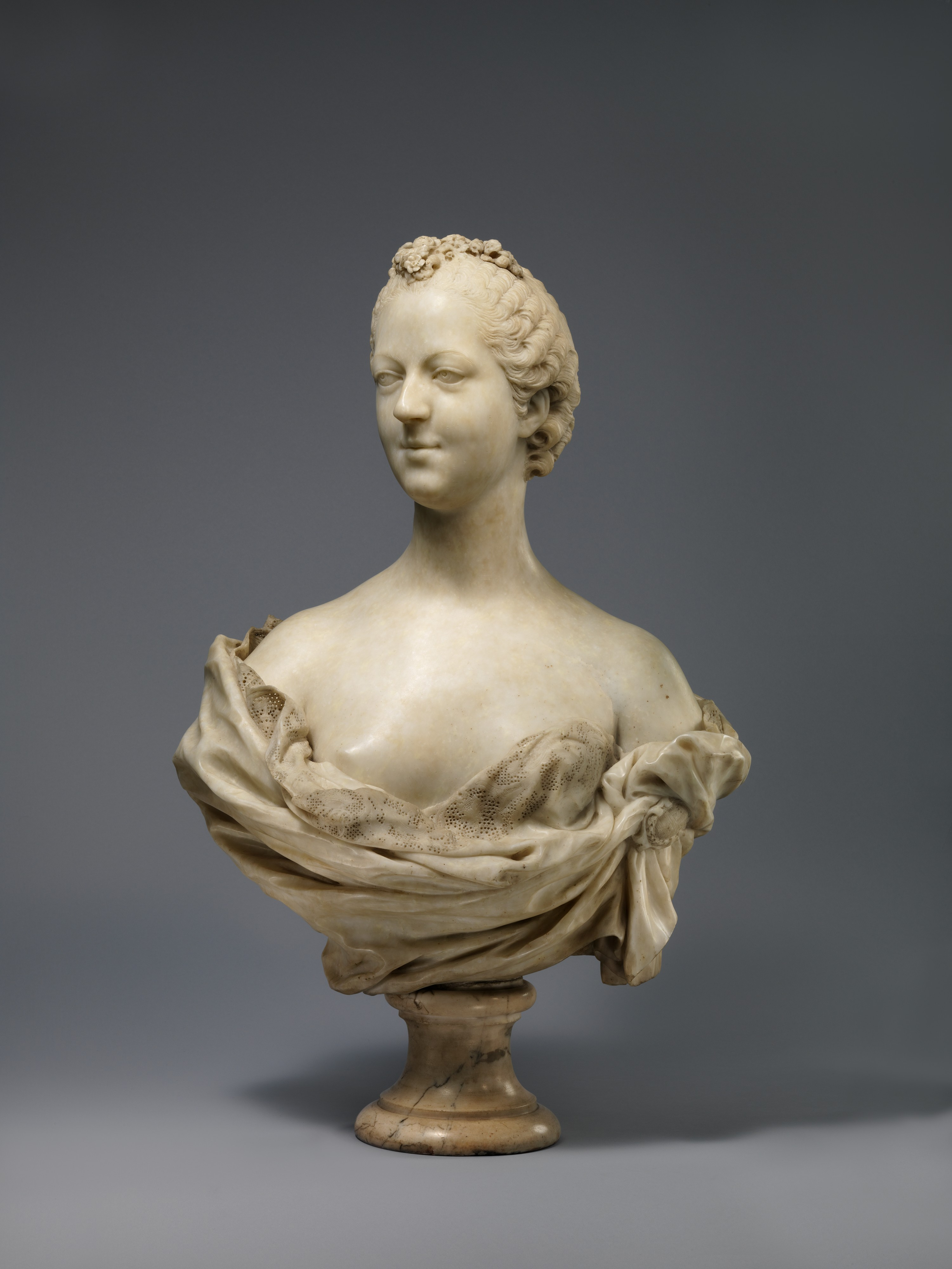
Madame de Pompadour, Metropolitan Museum of Art, New York (1748–51)

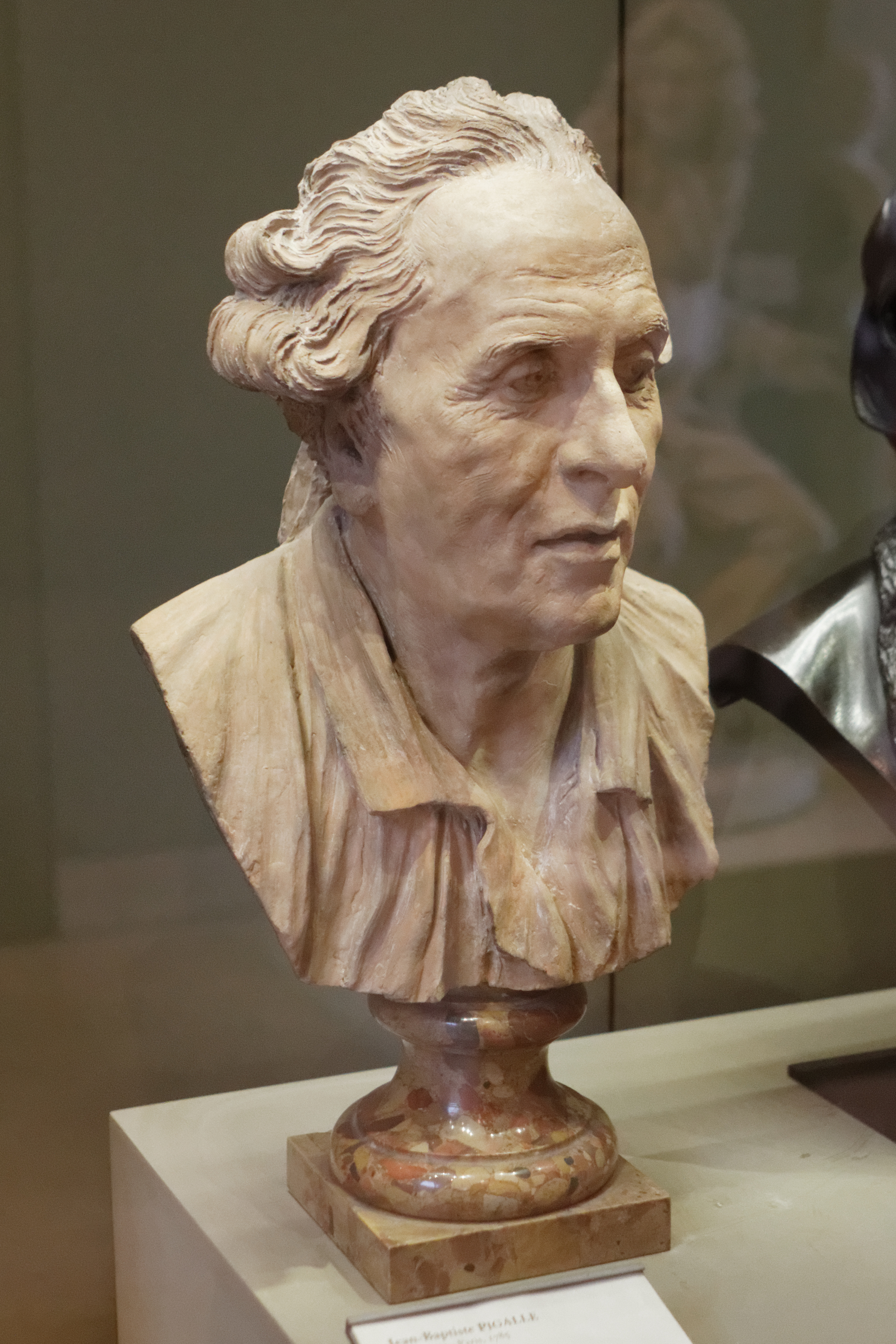
Self-portrait (1770s, Louvre)
