= Magdalen College School =

Magdalen College School may refer to:

- Magdalen College School, Oxford, Oxfordshire
- Magdalen College School, Brackley, Northamptonshire
- Magdalen College School, Wainfleet, Lincolnshire

== See also ==
- Magdalen College (disambiguation)
