= Madeleine-Élisabeth Pigalle =

French artist (1751–1827)

Madeleine-Élisabeth Pigalle, sometimes known as Madelon (1751–1827), was a French painter.

Born in Sens, Pigalle was distantly related to Jean-Baptiste Pigalle; he is said to have provided her with lessons upon visiting her hometown in 1766 and finding that she had artistic talent. Her father was the merchant Gervais-Protais Pigalle (1724–1802). In 1782, she showed an oil painting at the Salon de la Correspondance, and in 1785 she produced a pastel head of a woman which received some notice. Pigalle died in Nemours.
