= SS Magdalena =

A number of steamships were named Magdalena:

- SS Magdalena (1909), a German cargo ship in service 1940–47
- SS Magdalena (1923), a British cargo ship torpedoed and sunk by U-48 in 1940
- SS Magdalena (1928), a Hamburg America Line ocean liner in service 1928–34

== See also ==
- RMS Magdalena, three ships with this name
