= Madaline =

Madaline may refer to:

== Computing ==
- MADALINE (from "Many ADALINE"), a neural network architecture

== People called Madaline ==
- Madaline Lee (1912–1974), American actress
- Madaline A. Williams (1894–1968), American politician
- Madlaine Traverse (1875-1964), sometimes Madaline Traverse, American actress

== See also ==
- Maddy (disambiguation)
- Madeleine (disambiguation)
- Magdalene (disambiguation)
- Madeline (disambiguation)
