= RMS Magdalena =

Three ships were of the Royal Mail Line were named RMS Magdalena.

- RMS Magdalena (1852), an ocean liner used as a troopship during the Crimean War
- RMS Magdalena (1889), an ocean liner in service 1889–1921
- RMS Magdalena (1948), a cargo liner that was wrecked on her maiden voyage in 1949.

== See also ==
- SS Magdalena, a number of ships with this name
