= Giovanni Maddalena =

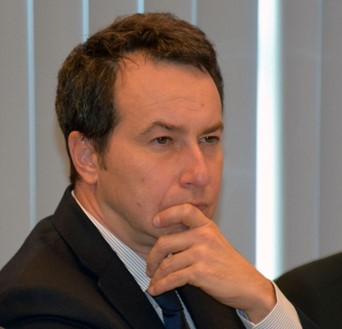

Giovanni Maddalena is full professor of theoretical philosophy at the University of Bologna, Italy. He previously taught at the University of Molise (2005–2025). He works on American philosophy, especially focusing on Charles Sanders Peirce and classic pragmatists.

== Career ==
=== Academic career ===
Maddalena obtained his PhD at Roma Tre University in 2000 and held research fellowships at the University of Eastern Piedmont and the University of Bari. At the University of Molise he was researcher from 2005, associate professor of history of philosophy from 2014 and full professor of theoretical philosophy from 2020. In 2026 he moved to the University of Bologna as full professor of theoretical philosophy.

=== Research ===
He proposes a new paradigm of reasoning in The Philosophy of Gesture (Montreal, McGill-Queen’s 2015). According to this philosophy a gesture "any performed act with a beginning and an end that carries on a meaning (from the Latin gero=to bear, to carry on)".

=== Fellowships and visiting positions ===
He is Senior Fellow of the Institute of American Thought (IUPUI, Indianapolis) and member of the scientific board of the Philosophy Department at École normale supérieure (Paris). Maddalena has been Fulbright Research Scholar at Indiana and Purdue Universities and visiting professor (professeur invité) at École Normale Supérieure. He has also been invited professor at the University of São Paulo (Brazil), the Universidad Sedes Sapientiae in Lima (Peru) and the Universidad Católica de Santa Fe (Argentina).

=== Editorial and institutional roles ===
He is founder and executive editor of the European Journal of Pragmatism and American Philosophy, founder and president of the Associazione Pragma (president 2018–2022), founder and co-director of the Vasily Grossman Study Center. He directs the series Biblioteca del Leonardo at Editore Carabba and collaborates with the newspapers Il Foglio, Tempi, Zafferano.news.

== Bibliography ==
- 2024 – (ed., with Fabio Ferrucci, Michela Bella and Matteo Santarelli) Gestures: Approaches, Uses, and Developments. Berlin: De Gruyter.
- 2023 – Il pensiero di Vasilij Grossman. Torino: Rosenberg & Sellier.
- 2021 – Filosofia del gesto. Un nuovo uso per pratiche antiche. Roma: Carocci.
- 2021 – (ed.) The Italian Pragmatists. Between Allies and Enemies. Edited by Maddalena G – Tuzet G., Brill-Rodopi, The Netherlands.
- 2020 – (with Guido Gili). The History and Theory of Post-Truth Communication. London: Palgrave-MacMillan.
- 2020 – (ed., with Pietro Tosco) John and Carol Garrard, Le ossa di Berdičev. La vita e il destino di Vasilij Grossman. Bologna: Marietti 1820.
- 2018 – (ed.) Vasily Grossman. A Writer’s Freedom. Edited by Bonola A.-Maddalena G., McGill-Queen’s University Press, Montreal.
- 2015 – The Philosophy of Gesture, Montreal: McGill-Queen’s University Press.
- 2015 – Peirce. Brescia: La Scuola.
- 2015 – (ed.) Il pragmatismo. Dalle origini agli sviluppi contemporanei, a cura di R.M Calcaterra, G. Maddalena, G. Marchetti, Carocci, Roma.
- 2009 – Metafisica per assurdo. Peirce e i problemi dell’epistemologia contemporanea, Rubbettino, Soveria Mannelli (CZ).
- 2005 – (editor and translator) C.S. Peirce, Scritti scelti, collana I Classici, UTET, Torino.
- 2003 – Istinto razionale. Studi sulla semiotica dell’ultimo Peirce, Trauben Editore, Torino.
- 2000 – La lotta delle tradizioni, MacIntyre e la filosofia in America, L’Arciere (Cuneo).
