= Madeline, West Virginia =

Madeline
- Unincorporated community
- Location within the state of West Virginia Madeline (the United States)
- Coordinates: 37°34′49″N 81°18′15″W
- Country: United States
- State: West Virginia
- County: Raleigh
- Elevation: 1,775 ft (541 m)
- Time zone: UTC-5 (Eastern (EST))
  - Summer (DST): UTC-4 (EDT)
- GNIS ID: 1542676

Madeline is an unincorporated community in Raleigh County, West Virginia, United States. A post office operated there from 1927 to 1933.
