= Magdalen College (disambiguation) =

Magdalen College is a constituent college of the University of Oxford.

Magdalen College or Magdalene College may also refer to:

- Magdalene College, Cambridge, a constituent college of the University of Cambridge
- Magdalen College of the Liberal Arts, formerly known simply as Magdalen College, a Catholic liberal arts college in New Hampshire, United States

== See also ==
- Magdalen College School (disambiguation)
- Magdalen Hall, Oxford, a former hall of the University of Oxford, originally sited next to the college of the same name, refounded as Hertford College
