= Madalan =

Madalan Мадалан
- Station
- Location within Amur Oblast Location within Russia
- Coordinates: 54°03′N 123°24′E
- Country: Russia
- Region: Amur Oblast
- District: Skovorodinsky District
- Time zone: UTC+9:00

Madalan (Russian: Мадалан) is a rural locality (a station) in Takhtamygdinsky Selsoviet of Skovorodinsky District, Amur Oblast, Russia. The population was 367 as of 2018. There are 9 streets.

== Geography ==
Madalan is located 61 km west of Skovorodino (the district's administrative centre) by road. Oldoy is the nearest rural locality.
