= Madelin =

Madelin is a surname and given name. Notable people with the name include:

- Alain Madelin (born 1946), French politician
- Louis Madelin (1871–1956), French historian
- Madelin Coit, American multi-media artist
- Madelin Riera (born 1989), Ecuadorian professional footballer
- Michael Francis Madelin (1931–2007), British mycologist
