= Madelyne =

Madelyne may refer to:

- Madelyne Delcroix (born 1946), French aviator
- Madelyne Pryor, fictional character in the Marvel Comics universe
- Madelyne Woods, American television personality
- Carlo Resoort, Dutch DJ, remixer and producer who has released tracks under the Madelyne alias

== See also ==
- Madelyn, a given name
- Madeleine (disambiguation)
