= Mădălina =

Mădălina is a Romanian feminine given name that may refer to:

- Mădălina Cioveie (born 1983), Romanian aerobic gymnast
- Mădălina Diana Ghenea (born 1987), Romanian-Italian actress and model
- Mădălina Gojnea (born 1987), Romanian tennis player
- Mădălina Manole (1967–2010), Romanian pop recording artist
- Mădălina Zamfirescu (born 1994), Romanian handballer
