= Madeline (Zach Bryan song) =

2025 single by Zach Bryan featuring Gabriella Rose

Single by Zach Bryan featuring Gabriella Rose
- Released: July 18, 2025
- Genre: Country
- Length: 2:25
- Label: Belting Broncos; Warner
- Songwriter: Zach Bryan
- Producer: Bryan

Zach Bryan singles chronology
"A Song for You" (2025)	"Madeline" (2025)	"Bowery" (2025)

Gabriella Rose singles chronology
"Watch My Necklace Swing" (2025)	"Madeline" (2025)

"Madeline" is a song by American singer-songwriter Zach Bryan, released on July 18, 2025. It features American singer Gabriella Rose.

== Composition ==
The song uses a stripped-down and "undulating" instrumental with guitar strums. Lyrically, it depicts the singers as a pair of lovers who are separated from each other and longing to be together despite their issues. The song revolves around a man being unable to move on from a past romance with a woman named Madeline. He admits he feels like he is "waiting 'round to die again". In the first verse, Zach Bryan addresses a picture of them holding a pitcher of their favorite beer (using wordplay), expressing how they seem to be different people in the present. Gabriella Rose sings the next verse from the perspective of Madeline in response, sharing his loneliness. She is in a fancy hotel, but would rather be in the run-down motel where they spent a night together, and pleads for him to come home. Bryan returns in the final verse, in which he asks someone at the bar to tell Madeline how much he needs her if they ever see her and wonders in frustration if she is back with her old boyfriend whom he disapproves of. The song closes without a resolution, leaving listeners to wonder if they ever rekindled their relationship.

== Critical reception ==
Maxim Mower of Holler wrote "The delicacy and intricacy of Gabriella Rose's voice complements Zach Bryan's heavy croons, with the former showcasing her versatility after becoming synonymous with swaggering, tongue-in-cheek tracks such as 'Doublewide' and 'Necklace'." Chris DeVille of Stereogum commented "The two of them sound brilliant together — his voice rugged, hers sweet — over an arrangement that leaves out the drums in pursuit of minimalist beauty. This one's in and out in two and a half minutes, and if you listen below, that time will be well-spent."

== Charts ==
=== Weekly charts ===
Weekly chart performance for "Madeline"
Chart (2025)	Peak position
Canada Hot 100 (Billboard)	56
New Zealand Hot Singles (RMNZ)	12
US Billboard Hot 100	62
US Hot Country Songs (Billboard)	15
US Hot Rock & Alternative Songs (Billboard)	10

=== Year-end charts ===
Year-end chart performance for "Madeline"
Chart (2025)	Position
US Hot Rock & Alternative Songs (Billboard)	52

== Certifications ==
Certifications for "Madeline"
Region	Certification	Certified units/sales
Canada (Music Canada)	Gold	40,000^{‡}
United States (RIAA)	Gold	500,000^{‡}
^{‡} Sales+streaming figures based on certification alone.
