= La Madeleine, Manche =

Coordinates: 49°24′50″N 1°11′9″W

La Madeleine (French pronunciation: [la madlɛn]) is a hamlet of Sainte-Marie-du-Mont village in North-western France which was one anchor point of the Utah Beach landings on the D-Day invasion of Hitler's Fortress Europa, 6 June 1944. Geographically, the village was the edge of the allied right flank along the left bank of the river Douve estuary.

On La Madeleine beach stands a museum dedicated to the Utah Beach landing.
