= Magdalene =

Magdalene or Magdalen may refer to:

== People ==
- Mary Magdalene, a disciple of Jesus
- Magdalene (given name), a feminine given name (including a list of people with the name)

== Organizations ==
- Magdalene Catholic College, a Roman Catholic secondary school in Macarthur, New South Wales, Australia
- Magdalene laundry, also known as a Magdalene asylum, a Protestant or Roman Catholic institution for “fallen women”

== Music ==
- Magdallan, later known as Magdalen, an American Christian metal band
- Magdalene (album), a 2019 album by FKA Twigs
- "Magdalene", a song by Lenny Kravitz from the 1995 album Circus
- "Magdalene", a song by White Zombie from the 2008 box set Let Sleeping Corpses Lie

== Other uses ==
- Magdalen Islands, an archipelago in Quebec, Canada
- Magdalene (comics), a Marvel Comics character
- Magdalene (sculpture), a 2005 sculpture by Dessa Kirk in Chicago, Illinois, U.S.

== See also ==
- Madeleine (disambiguation)
- Magdalen College (disambiguation)
- Magdalena (disambiguation)
