= Belgian Railways Class 41 =

NMBS/SNCB Class 41
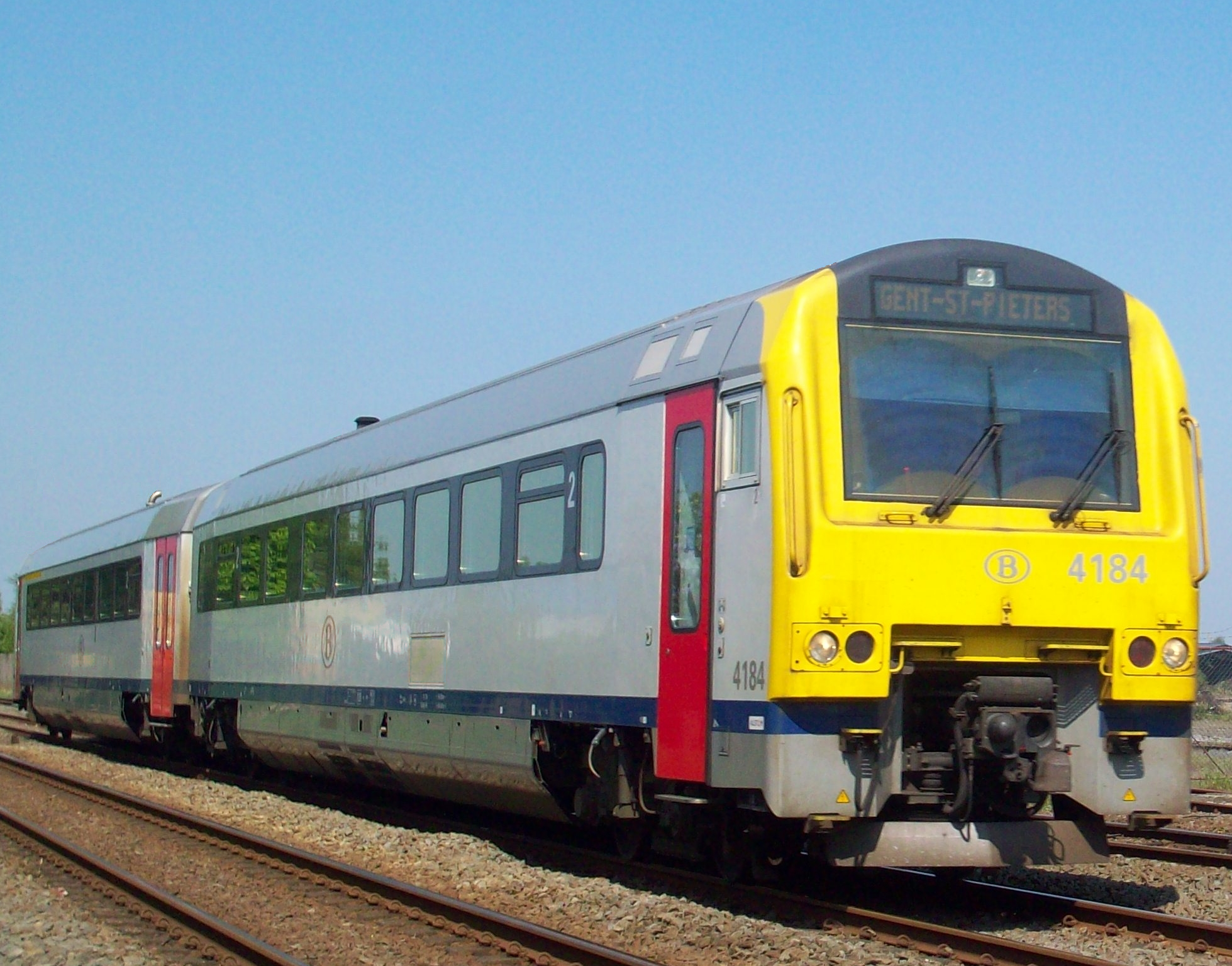
- 4184 near Wondelgem Station
- In service: 2000–present
- Manufacturer: Alstom
- Constructed: 2000–2002
- Number built: 96
- Formation: DMC-DMS
- Capacity: 12F, 138S, 2T
- Operators: NMBS/SNCB

Specifications
- Car length: 24.80 m (81 ft 4 in)
- Maximum speed: 120 km/h (75 mph)
- Weight: 93 t (205,000 lb)
- Traction system: Diesel hydraulic
- Safety system(s): ETCS
- Track gauge: 1,435 mm (4 ft 8 1/2 in)

NMBS/SNCB Class 41 DMUs are diesel multiple-unit trains operated by the National Railway Company of Belgium (NMBS/SNCB). They are the standard train for Belgian internal workings which cannot be worked by EMUs. They work under the 25 kV electrification in the South of Belgium as well as on the non-electrified lines in the North.

== Naming ==
They are often designated as "AR41" (referring to the French "Autorail") or "MW41" (for Dutch "Motorwagen") which would make them single railcars; they are always operated as (multiples of) two cars joined, with a single vehicle number.

== Lines operated ==
- Antwerpen-Centraal – Neerpelt/Hasselt (Portions separated at Mol)
- Eeklo - Gent-Sint-Pieters - De Pinte – Oudenaarde – Ronse
- Gent-Sint-Pieters – Zottegem – Geraardsbergen
- Aalst – Burst
- Charleroi Sud – Couvin

In summer, tourist trains:

- Neerpelt-Blankenberge via Herentals, Lier, Mechelen, Dendermonde, Gent, Brugge.

== See also ==
- AR 41
