= Longwy station =

Railway station in France

Coordinates: 49°30′47″N 5°46′9″E

Longwy station is a railway station serving the town Longwy, Meurthe-et-Moselle department, northeastern France. It is situated on the Longuyon–Mont-Saint-Martin railway. The station is served by regional trains towards Luxembourg, Charleville-Mézières and Nancy.

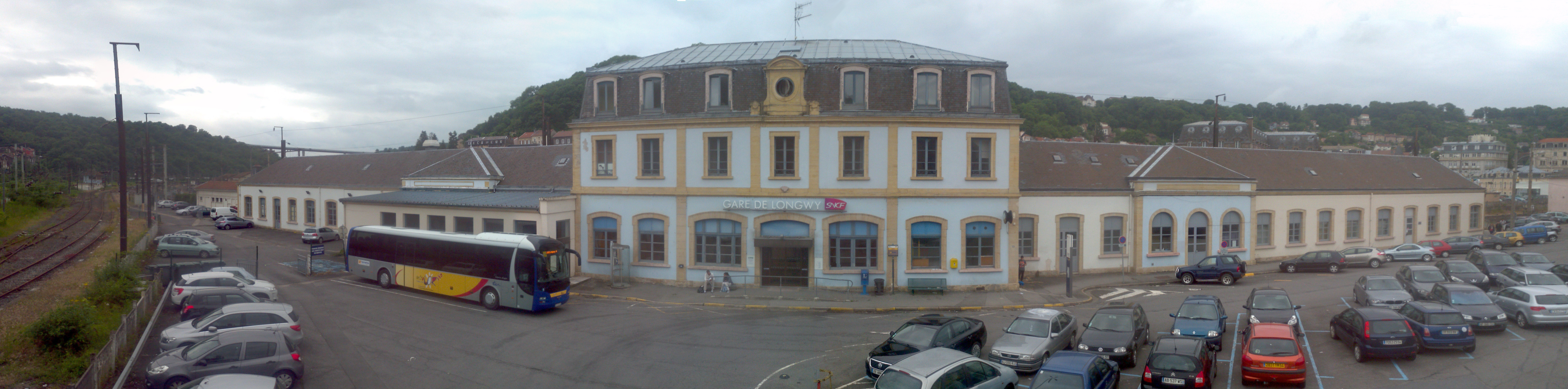
Station

Preceding station	TER Grand Est	Following station
Longuyon towards Charleville-Mézières	C08	Terminus
Longuyon towards Nancy	L25	Terminus
Preceding station	CFL	Following station
Rodange towards Luxembourg	Line 70	Terminus
