= Lamadelaine =

Town in the commune of Pétange, Luxembourg

Coordinates: 49°33′N 5°51′E

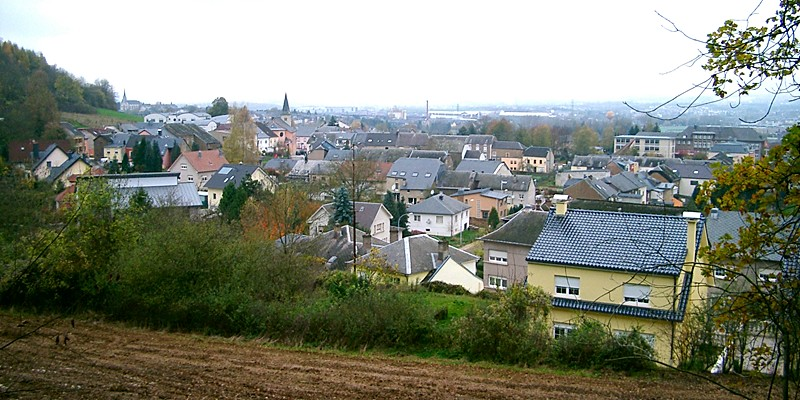

Lamadelaine (French pronunciation: [lamadlɛn]; Luxembourgish: Rolléng; German: Rollingen [ˈʁɔlɪŋən]) is a town in the commune of Pétange, Luxembourg. As of September 2026, the town has a population of 3,234.
