= Luxembourg railway station =

Railway station in Luxembourg

Luxembourg Lëtzebuerg
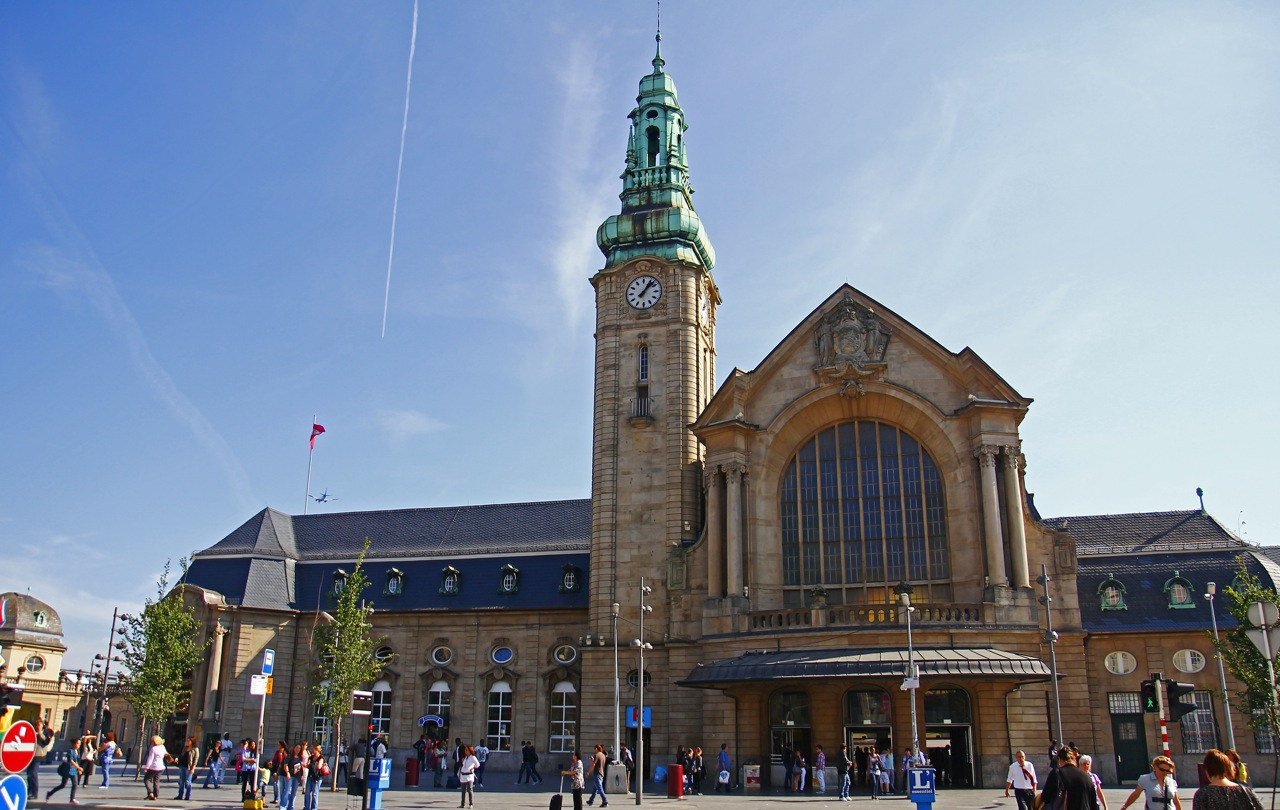
- The station's facade at Place de la Gare is in the traditional Moselle Baroque Revival style.

General information
- Location: 11 place de la Gare, L-1616; Gare; Luxembourg
- Coordinates: 49°36′00″N 6°08′03″E
- Owner: Luxembourg
- Operator: CFL
- Platforms: 6
- Tracks: 13
- Train operators: CFL; SNCF; SNCB; DB

History
- Opened: 4 October 1859

Passengers
- 2022: 15,765,929
- Rank: 1 of 60
Services
Preceding station	CFL	Following station
Terminus	Line 10	Pfaffenthal-Kirchberg towards Troisvierges or Diekirch
Terminus	Line 30	Cents-Hamm towards Trier Hbf
Terminus	Line 50	Bertrange-Strassen towards Arlon
Terminus	Line 60	Howald towards Rodange
Terminus	Line 70	Hollerich towards Athus or Longwy
Preceding station	DB Fernverkehr	Following station
Terminus	IC 37 Operated in cooperation with DB	Wasserbillig towards Düsseldorf Hbf
Preceding station	SNCF	Following station
Thionville towards Paris-Est	TGV inOui	Terminus
Preceding station	TER Grand Est	Following station
Howald towards Metz	L01b	Terminus
Preceding station	DB Regio Mitte	Following station
Terminus	RE 11	Sandweiler-Contern towards Koblenz Hbf
Terminus	RB 83	Cents-Hamm towards Wittlich Hbf
Preceding station	NMBS/SNCB	Following station
Arlon towards Bruxelles-Midi / Brussel-Zuid	IC 16 IC "des Ardennes" & Luxembourg	Terminus
Terminus	IC 33	Mersch towards Liers
Location

Luxembourg railway station (Luxembourgish: Gare Lëtzebuerg [ˌɡaːʀ ˈlətsəbu̯əɕ], French: Gare de Luxembourg, German: Bahnhof Luxemburg) is the main railway station serving Luxembourg City, in southern Luxembourg. It is operated by Chemins de Fer Luxembourgeois, the state-owned railway company. In 2022, the station was used by 52,000 passengers every weekday, making it by far the busiest in the country.

It is the hub of Luxembourg's domestic railway network, serving as a point of call on all of Luxembourg's railway lines. It also functions as the country's international railway hub, with services to the surrounding countries: Belgium, France, and Germany. Since June 2007, the LGV Est has connected the station to the French TGV network.

The station is located 2 kilometres (1.2 mi) south of the city centre (Ville Haute), to the south of the River Pétrusse. The station gives its name to Gare, one of the Districts of Luxembourg City.

The railway station serves as the central hub for all modes of transport within Luxembourg, with a tram stop and a bus hub for buses operated by the City of Luxembourg and buses of the RGTR network.

== History ==
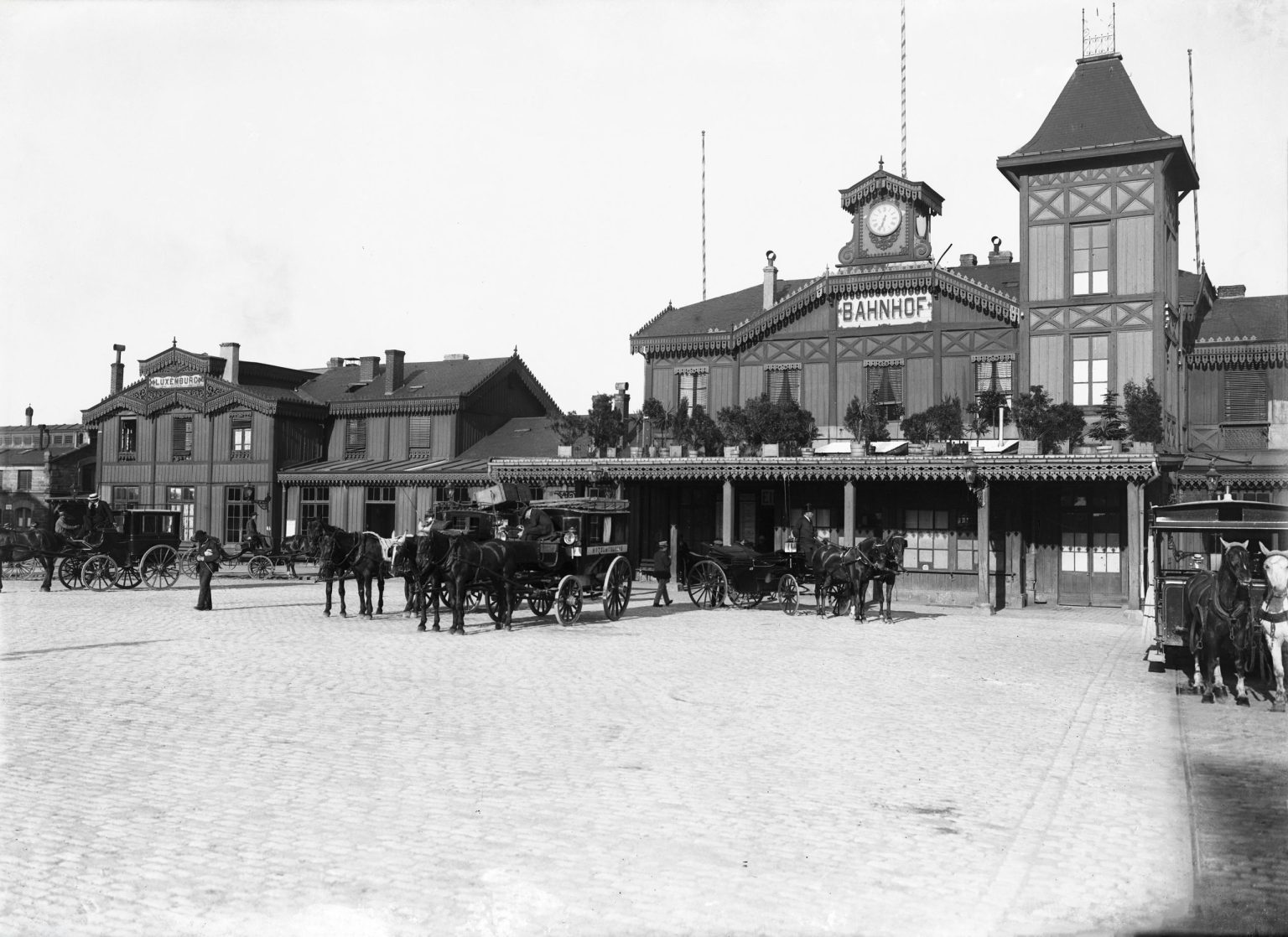
The original station building, at an unknown date

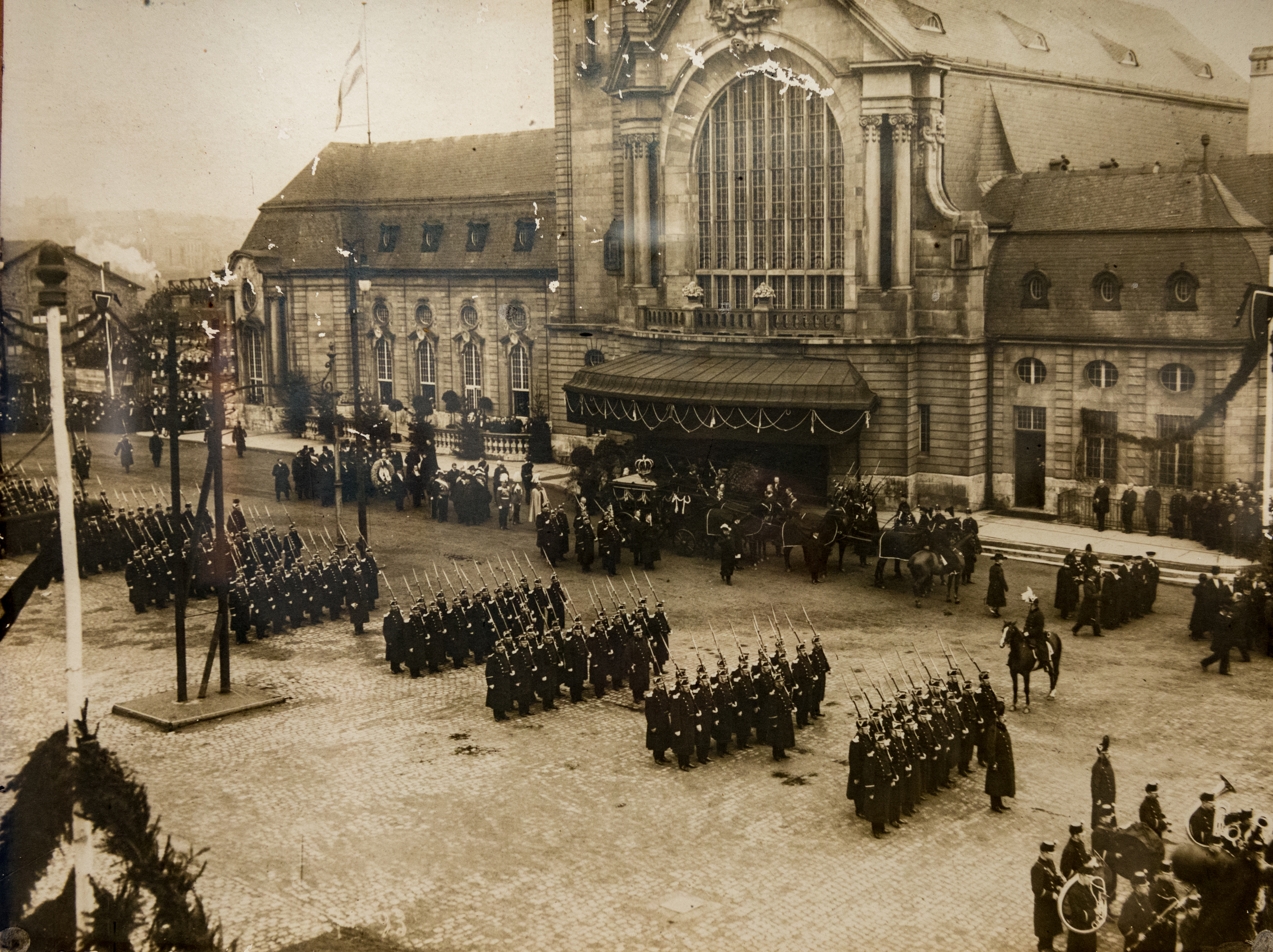
Military parade by the newly completed station in 1912, during the funeral of Grand Duke William IV

In 1846, with a vision to create an international line between the North Sea ports, the Alps and the Mediterranean, the Grande Compagnie du Luxembourg, a Belgian company, obtained a concession from the Luxembourgish government for a railway line between Arlon and Thionville, with Luxembourg City as its central point, and a branch line to Trier. Unable to fulfil its obligations, it was stripped of its concessions in 1848.

The creation of Luxembourg's first rail network was finally awarded in the 1850s to a French-funded company, the Société royale grand-ducale des chemins de fer Guillaume-Luxembourg.

In 1857, the location of the city's future railway station was the subject of debate, with five possibilities being considered. One of these, which was favoured by city authorities, was the Plateau du Saint-Esprit, at the southeastern edge of the Ville Haute - now the site of the Judiciary City - but it was ultimately turned down for military reasons. Other rejected proposals included establishing the station between the northern city gates and the Limpertsberg (around the site of the current Glacis square), to the west of the fortress (at the modern-day Place de l'Étoile), or down in the valley, in the Clausen district, which would have involved digging a tunnel under the Ville-Haute.

The position chosen for the station on the Bourbon Plateau, separated from the Ville Haute by the Pétrusse gorges and away from the urban sprawl of the time, was due to the city still being a Prussian-held fortress at the time. The first station was built entirely out of wood, due to building restrictions that still applied in a 979 metres (3,212 ft) radius around the edges of the fortress. It was opened on 11 August 1859 (at the same time as the country's inaugural line, from Luxembourg to Bettembourg and the French border); the patriotic song De Feierwon (The Chariot of Fire), which was briefly considered Luxembourg's national anthem, was composed and performed for the occasion. In 1860, the completion of the line from Luxembourg to Kleinbettingen enabled trains to run to Arlon, Brussels, Antwerp and Ostend. The first link between the city and northern Luxembourg came in 1861, with the construction of a viaduct over the Alzette river. After the 1867 Treaty of London, the fortifications were dismantled, which allowed the city to expand around the railway station.

The old wooden station was replaced by a modern building built between 1907 and 1913 (during an economic boom fuelled by iron production in the Red Lands). The new building was designed by a trio of German architects (Rüdell, Jüsgen and Scheuffel), in a neo-Baroque style - an imitation of the architecture popular in the 17th century in what is now the Moselle department of France - that dominates Luxembourg City's major public buildings.

The installations underwent a major overhaul during the electrification of the Luxembourgish railway network, which began in 1956. Because of the voltage difference between line 5 and the rest of the network, Luxembourg station was switchable.

The passenger building has been listed as a national monument since 13 January 1989.

The computerisation of the interlocking installations in the 1990s made it possible to do away with the station's specific signalling for switchable tracks, which could, for example, prevent an electric train from shunting because the track was not at the right voltage, but allow a diesel train to pass; the new computer system can manage these movements with conventional signalling.

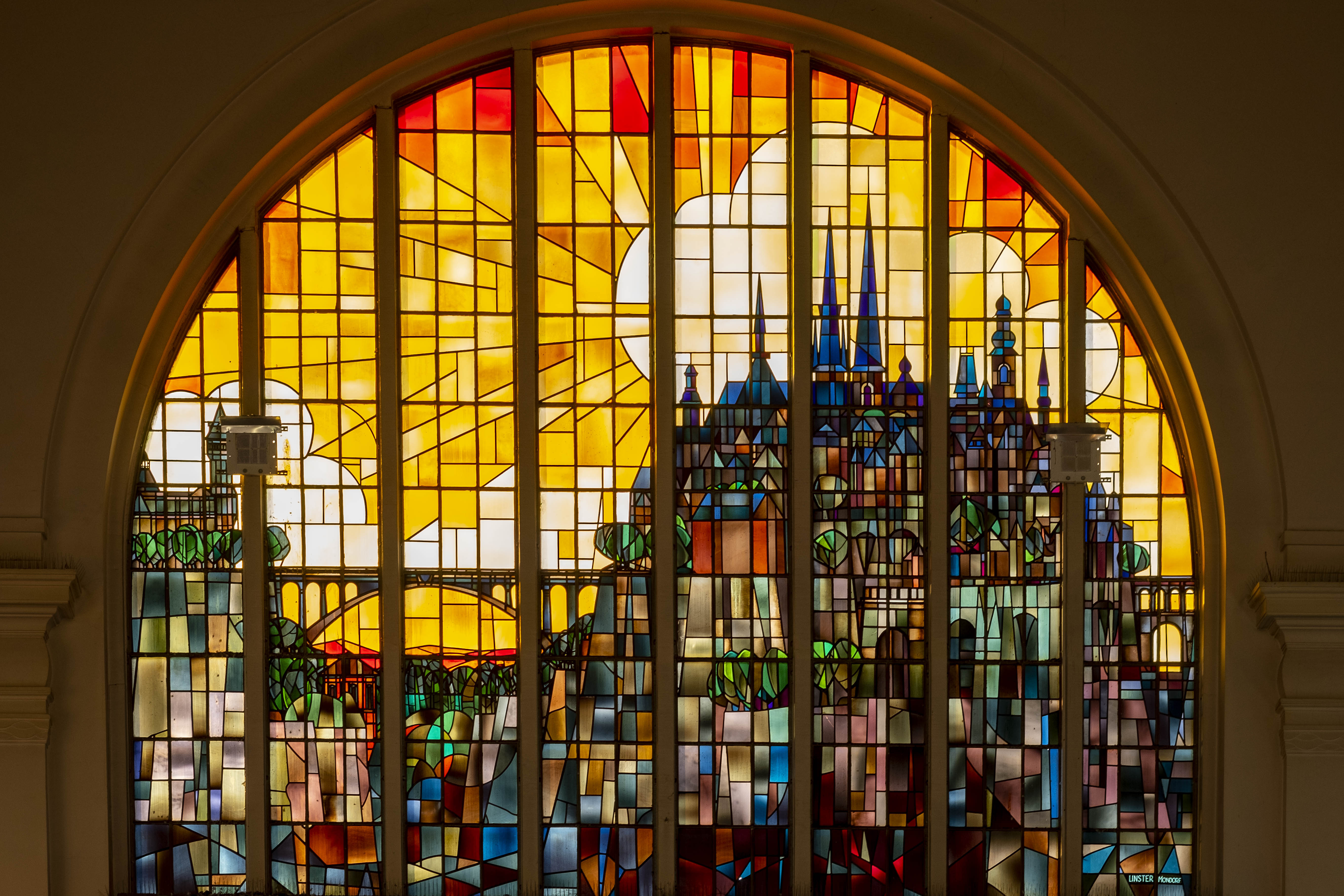
The station's main hall is dominated by a stained glass window representing the city's silhouette.

Since 2006, under the patronage of the Ministry of Transport, the station has undergone a major refurbishment which, by 2009, had already resulted in the creation of the new ticket sales facilities inside the main concourse, the widening of platforms, the installation of new lifts and a new underpass. Further work included renewing the overhead electrical wiring, installing two escalators at platform level, a new entrance gantry and the reconfiguration of the forecourt. Works in 2011 included a glass passenger concourse and a four-story car park. The new passenger concourse was inaugurated on 21 September 2012.

In anticipation of the arrival of the TGV connexion to Paris in 2007, round trips by TGV on conventional lines were operated from 25 June 2006.

The weekend night train connection between Metz and Portbou was extended to Luxembourg on 13 December 2009; however, it was suspended on 26 June 2016.

In 2016, the Luxembourg-Blankenberge express, a summer train to the coastal town of Blankenberghe, was also suspended due to works on the Belgian rail network.

== Modernisation work ==
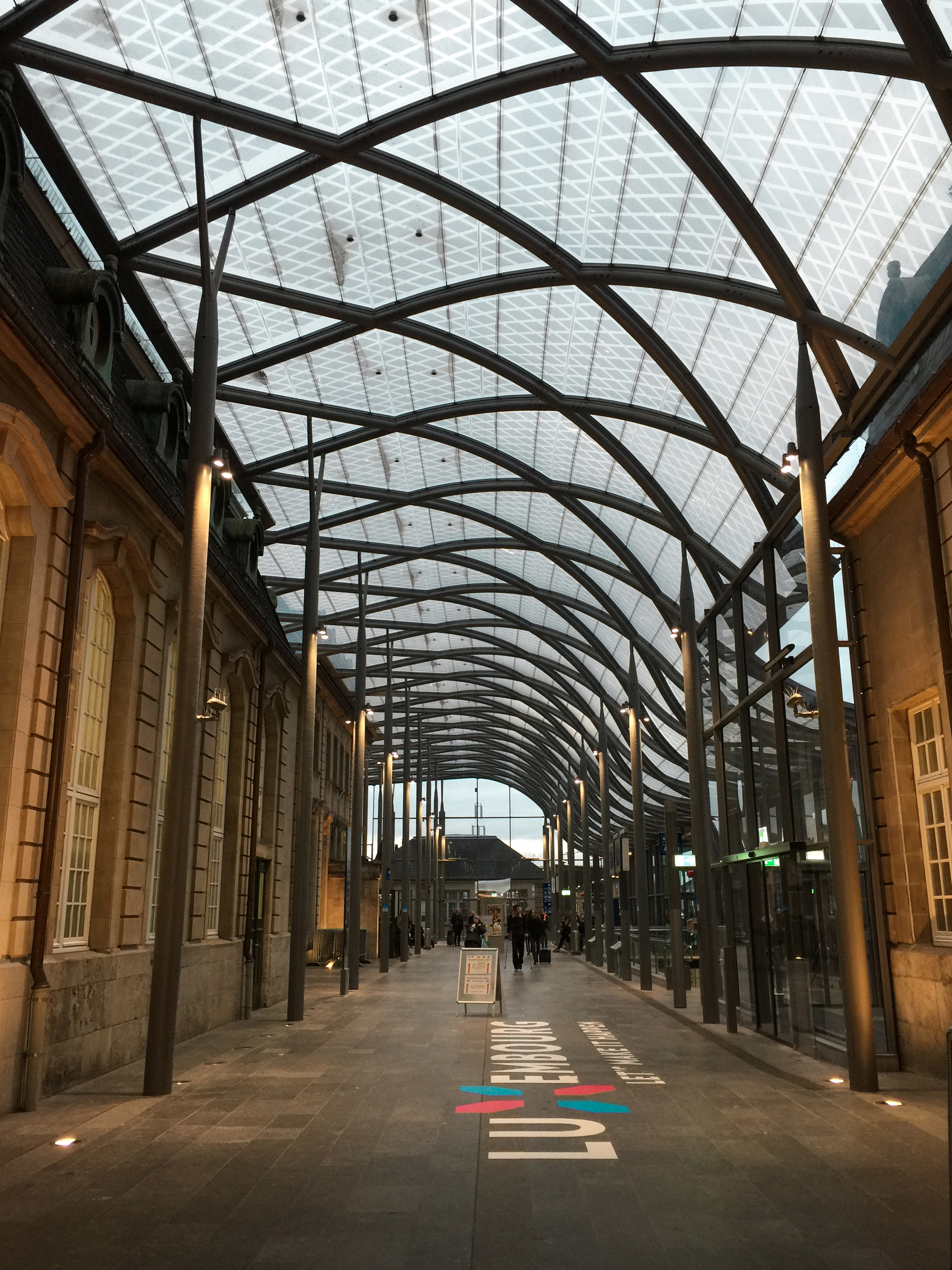
Modernised hallway

In 2006, the Ministry of Transport began a six-year renovation project on Luxembourg station that totaled €95 million. The improvements included new ticketing and sales facilities inside the main hall, expanding platforms, new lifts, a new passenger subway, upgraded overhead electrical wiring, installation of two platform escalators, a new entrance porch, a redesigned forecourt, a glass passenger hall, and a four-storey car park.

== Train services ==
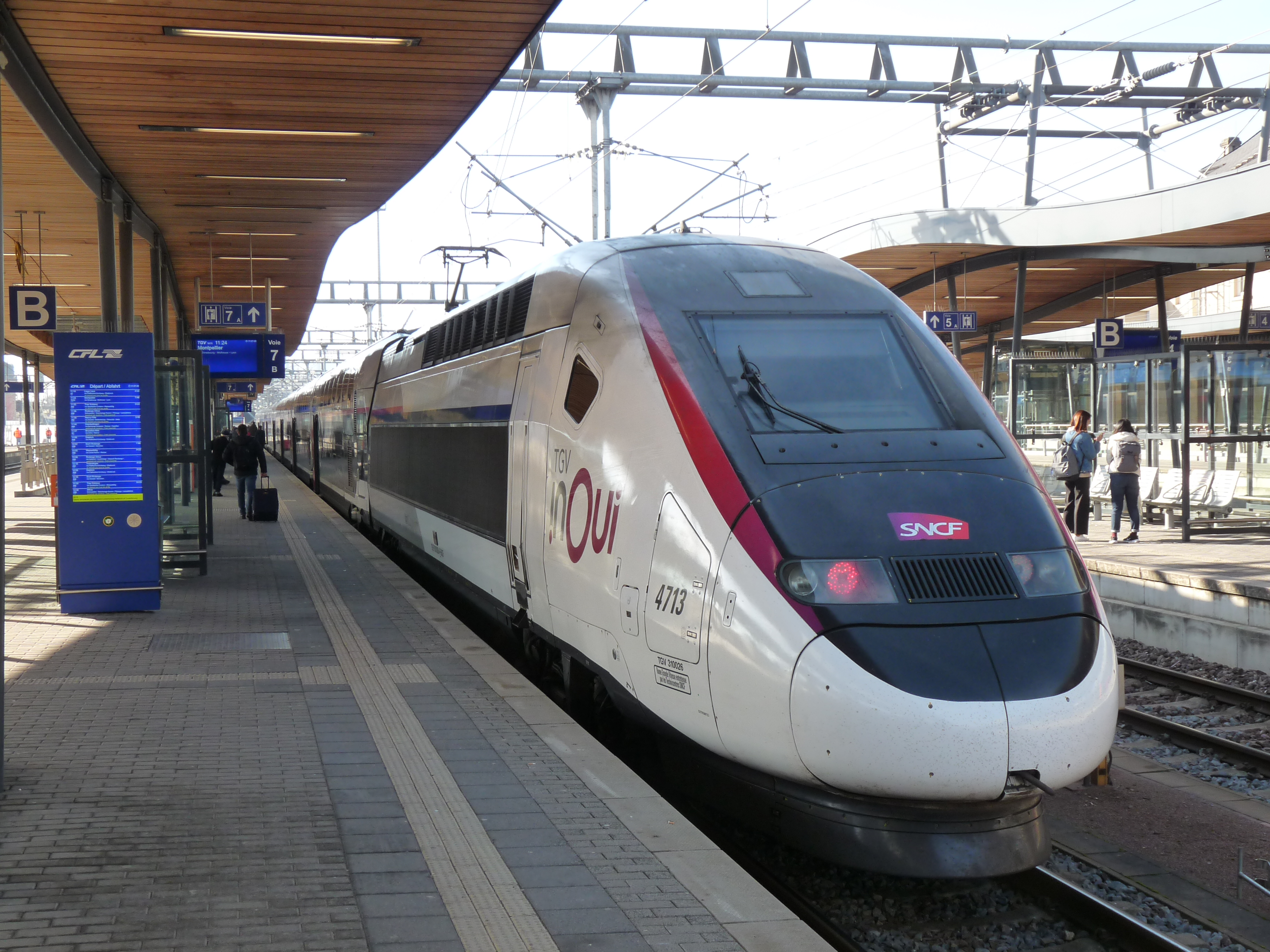
An SNCF TGV Euroduplex at Luxembourg station

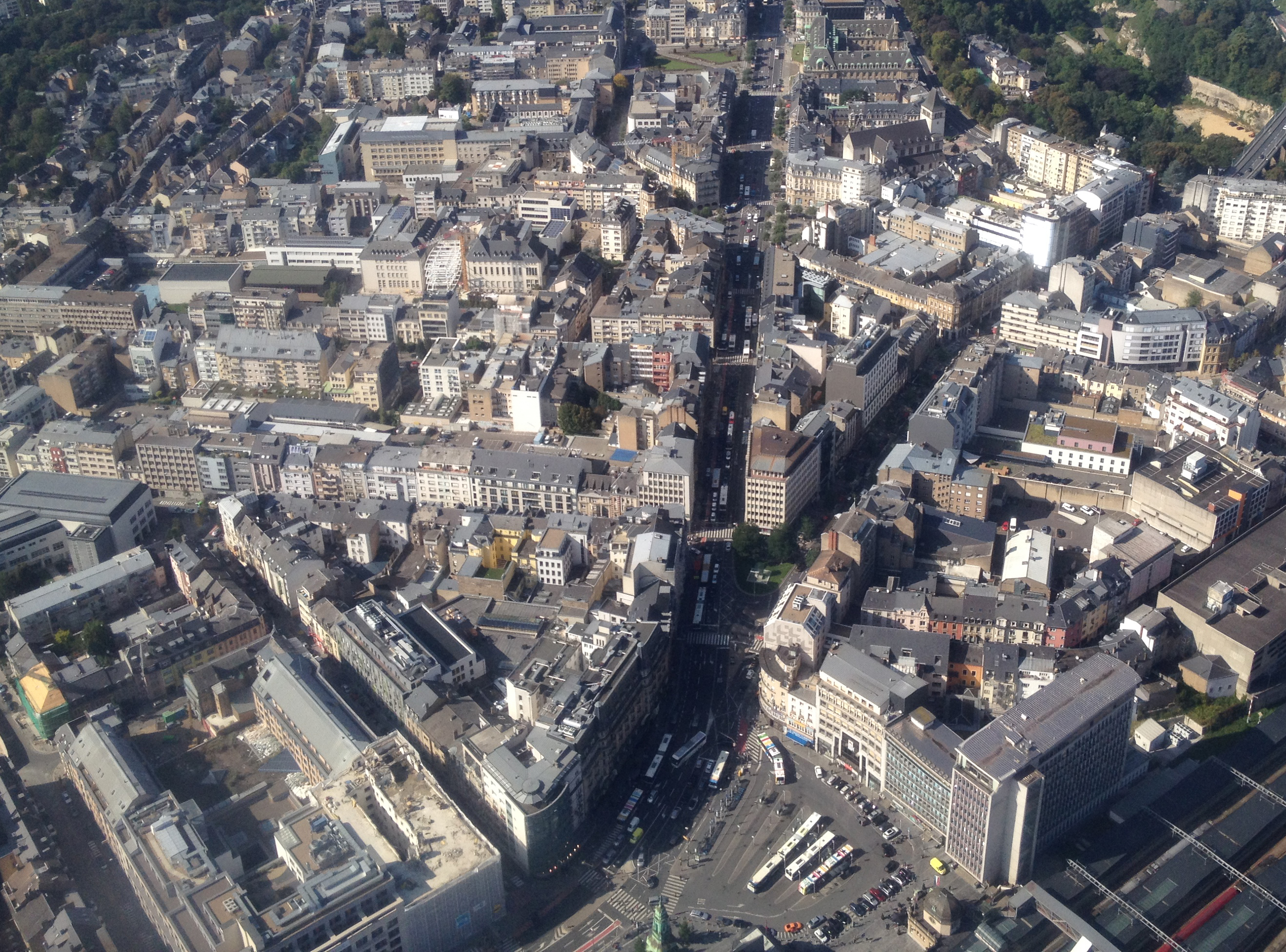
Aerial view of the railway station's Place de la Gare and the district around Avenue de la Liberté in 2014, prior to the installation of the new tramway.

As of December 2025, the station is served by the following services:

- High speed (TGV) services Luxembourg - Thionville - Metz - Paris
- TGV services Luxembourg - Thionville - Metz - Strasbourg - Lyon - Marseille
- TGV services Luxembourg - Thionville - Metz - Strasbourg - Lyon - Montpellier
- Intercity (IC) services Luxembourg - Ettelbruck - Troisvierges - Gouvy - Liège
- IC services Luxembourg - Arlon (- Namur - Brussels)
- Regional Express (RE) services Luxembourg - Ettelbruck - Troisvierges
- RE services Luxembourg - Wasserbillig - Trier - Koblenz - Düsseldorf
- RE services Luxembourg - Bettembourg - Esch-sur-Alzette - Pétange - Rodange
- RE services Rodange - Pétange - Esch-sur-Alzette - Bettembourg - Luxembourg - Mersch - Ettelbruck - Troisvierges
- RE services Pétange - Esch-sur-Alzette - Bettembourg - Luxembourg - Mersch
- RE services Luxembourg - Dippach-Reckange - Pétange - Rodange - Longwy
- RE services Luxembourg - Kleinbettingen - Arlon
- Regional (RB) services Luxembourg - Ettelbruck - Diekirch
- RB services Luxembourg - Wasserbillig - Trier - Wittlich
- RB services Luxembourg - Sandweiler-Contern- Wasserbillig
- RB services Luxembourg - Bettembourg - Esch-sur-Alzette - Pétange - Rodange
- RB services Luxembourg - Dippach-Reckange - Pétange - Rodange - Athus
- RB services Luxembourg - Kleinbettingen - Arlon
- TER Grand Est services Luxembourg - Bettembourg - Thionville - Metz
- TER Grand Est services Luxembourg - Bettembourg - Thionville - Metz - Nancy

== See also ==
- History of rail transport in Luxembourg
- Luxembourg railway network
