= Mary Magdalene (disambiguation) =

Mary Magdalene is a religious figure in Christianity.

Mary Magdalene may also refer to:

== Films ==
- Mary Magdalene (1914 film), a silent film starring Constance Crawley
- Mary Magdalene (1920 film), a German silent drama starring Eduard von Winterstein
- Mary Magdalene (2018 film), a drama film starring Rooney Mara
- Mary Magdalene (2026 film), a drama film written, produced, directed and starring Gessica Généus

== Visual arts ==
- Saint Mary Magdalene (Erhart), a sculpture of c. 1515–1520 by Gregor Erhart
- Mary Magdalene (Artemisia Gentileschi), a 1616–18 Italian painting by Artemisia Gentileschi
- Mary Magdalene (Perugino), a c. 1500 Dutch oil on panel painting by Pietro Perugino
- Mary Magdalene (Sandys), a Pre-Raphaelite painting by Frederick Sandys
- Mary Magdalene (Savoldo), a c.1535-1540 painting by Giovanni Girolamo Savoldo
- Mary Magdalene (Scorel), a c. 1530 Dutch oil on panel painting by Jan van Scorel
- Mary Magdalene (Stevens), an 1887 painting by Alfred Stevens
- Mary Magdalene (Tzanes), a tempera painting by Konstantinos Tzanes
- Mary Magdalene (Vouet), a 1614–1615 French painting by Simon Vouet

== Other uses ==
- Mary Magdalene (play), a 1910 tragic play by Maurice Maeterlinck
- Mary Magdalene de' Pazzi (1566–1607), saint of the Catholic Church
- "Mary Magdalene", a song by FKA Twigs from Magdalene (2019)
- "Maria Magdalena", a song by Senidah and Surreal from Za Tebe (2022)
- "Marija Magdalena", a song by Doris Dragović from Krajem vijeka (1999)

== People with the given names ==
- Marlene Dietrich or Marie Magdalene Dietrich (1901–1992), German-American actress and singer
- Mary Magdalene Marshall (1783–1877), American real-estate investor and philanthropist

== See also ==
- Maria Maddalena (disambiguation)
- Maria Magdalena (disambiguation)
- Marie-Madeleine (disambiguation)
- Penitent Magdalene (Donatello), an Italian sculpture by Donatello
- St. Mary Magdalene's Church (disambiguation)
- Santa Maria (disambiguation)
- Magdalene (disambiguation)
