= Marie-Madeleine =

Marie-Madeleine may refer to:

== People ==
- Marie-Madeleine, the pen name of Gertrud von Puttkamer (1881–1944), German writer of lesbian erotica
- Marie-Madeleine Bonafon, French novelist
- Marie-Madeleine de Chauvigny de la Peltrie (1603–1671), Frenchwoman who helped to establish the Ursuline Order in Quebec
- Marie-Madeleine Davy (1903–1998), French historian, philosopher, war resister
- Marie Madeleine Diallo (born 1948), Senegalese actress
- Marie-Madeleine Dienesch (1914–1998), French politician
- Marie Madeleine Duchapt, French fashion merchant
- Marie-Madeleine Duruflé (1921–1999), French organist
- Marie Madeleine Fouda, Cameroonian physician and politician
- Marie-Madeleine Fourcade (1909–1989), the leader of the French Resistance network "Alliance"
- Marie-Madeleine Frémy (died 1788), French artist
- Marie-Madeleine Gauthier (1920–1998), French medieval art historian and author
- Marie Madeleine Agnès de Gontaut, French aristocrat
- Marie-Madeleine Guimard (1743–1816), French ballerina
- Marie-Madeleine Hachard (1704–1760), French letter writer and abbess of the Ursuline order
- Marie-Madeleine Jodin (1741–1790), French actor and author
- Marie Madeleine Kamano, Guinean politician
- Marie-Madeleine Lachenais (1778–1843), de facto Haitian politician
- Marie-Madeleine Mborantsuo (born 1955), Gabonese lawyer
- Marie-Madeleine de Parabère (1693–1755), French aristocrat
- Marie-Madeleine Postel (1756–1846), French Roman Catholic saint
- Marie-Madeleine Prongué (1939–2019), Swiss politician
- Marie Madeleine de Rochechouart de Mortemart (1645–1704), French abbess, better known as Gabrielle de Rochechouart
- Marie Madeleine Seebold Molinary (1866–1948), American painter
- Marie Madeleine Togo (born 1954), Malian politician

== Places ==
- Sainte-Marie-Madeleine, Quebec, parish municipality in southwestern Quebec, Canada
- Église Sainte-Marie-Madeleine, Roman Catholic church in Paris

== See also ==
- Magdalena lugens, H.343 & H.343 a, motet by Marc-Antoine Charpentier (1686 - 87)
- Marie-Magdeleine, oratorio (Drame Sacré) in three acts and four parts by Jules Massenet to a French libretto by Louis Gallet
- Mary Magdalene
- Maria-Magdalena (disambiguation)
- Maria Maddalena (disambiguation)
