= Madonna della Consolazione =

Painting by Pietro Perugino

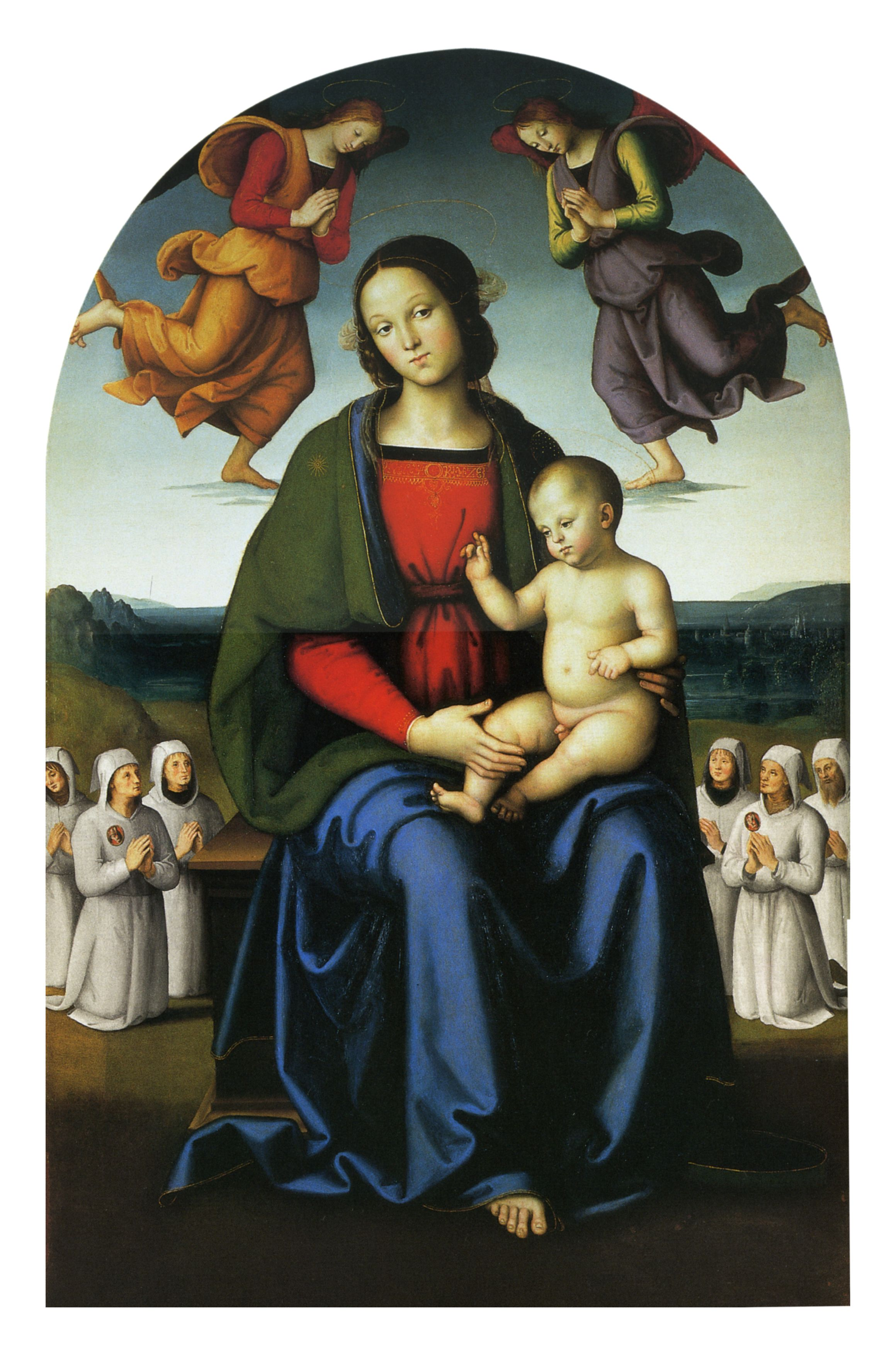
- Artist: Perugino
- Year: c. 1496–1498
- Medium: oil on panel
- Dimensions: 183 cm × 130 cm (72 in × 51 in)
- Location: La Galleria Nazionale dell'Umbria, Perugia

Madonna della Consolazione (English: Our Lady of Consolation) is an oil on panel painting by Perugino, datable c. 1496–1498. The work, completed in April 1498, was carried out in the Sala delle Udienze of the Collegio del Cambio. Since c. 1820 it is preserved in the National Gallery of Umbria in Perugia.

== History ==
The painting of the Mother of God under her title Our Lady of Consolation was accomplished for the Confraternita dei disciplinati di San Francesco in Perugia (lit: the Brotherhood of Disciples of Saint Francis in Perugia).

The figure of the Madonna is stylistically similar to works for which the artist's wife Chiara Fancelli modelled. Behind the Madonna and child are on both sides kneeling members of the brotherhood who wear their typical white cloaks with a badge. Above it are symmetrically arranged two angels in adoration, in the same manner as used for Perugino's San Francesco al Prato Resurrection, Madonna in Glory with Saints, Gonfalone della Giustizia and other works. The deep landscape background with a town in the distance is characteristic of the artist. He used a somewhat similar composition for the Tezi Altarpiece.

With the Napoleonic suppressions the Madonna delle Consolatione was added to the collections of the National Gallery of Umbria.

== Bibliography ==
- (in Italian) Vittoria Garibaldi, Perugino, in Pittori del Rinascimento, Scala, Florence, 2004 ISBN 888117099X
- (in Italian) Pierluigi De Vecchi, Elda Cerchiari, I tempi dell'arte, volume 2, Bompiani, Milan, 1999 ISBN 88-451-7212-0
- (in Italian) Stefano Zuffi, Il Quattrocento, Electa, Milan, 2004 ISBN 8837023154
