= Maria Magdalena =

Maria Magdalena or Maria-Magdalena may refer to:

== People ==
- Mary Magdalene, one of Jesus' most celebrated disciples
- Maria Magdalena of Oettingen-Baldern (1619–1688), second wife of the Margrave William of Baden-Baden
- Archduchess Maria Maddalena of Austria (1589–1631), daughter of Charles II, Archduke of Inner Austria, wife of Cosimo II de' Medici, Grand Duke of Tuscany
- Archduchess Maria Magdalena of Austria (1689–1743), daughter of Emperor Leopold I

== Churches ==
- Colegiata de Santa María Magdalena, a church in Asturias, Spain
- Santa María Magdalena, Seville, a Baroque church in Seville, Spain
- Santa María Magdalena, Zaragoza, a church in Zaragoza, Spain
- Maria Magdalena Church, a church on Södermalm in central Stockholm, Sweden

== Film and television ==
- María Magdalena (film), a 1954 Argentine film
- María Magdalena: Pecadora de Magdala, a 1946 Mexican film
- María Magdalena (TV series), a 2019 American TV series

== Music ==
- "(I'll Never Be) Maria Magdalena", a 1985 pop song by Sandra
- "Maria Magdalena" (song), the Austrian entry in the Eurovision Song Contest 1993
- "Maria Magdalena", a song by Senidah and Surreal from Za Tebe (2022)
- "Maria Magdalena" (ballad), a Scandinavian ballad
- Maria Magdalena, a 2011 EP by Visions of Atlantis
- Choreographic Symphony "Maria Magdalena", a 1918 orchestral composition by Kōsaku Yamada

== Other uses ==
- Maria Magdalena (Hebbel), an 1844 German play by Christian Friedrich Hebbel

== People with the given names ==
- María Magdalena Campos Pons (born 1959), Cuban artist
- Maria Magdalena Dumitrache (born 1977), Romanian rower
- Maria Magdalena Jahn, German religious of the Sisters of St. Elizabeth
- Maria Magdalena Keverich (1746–1787), mother of Ludwig van Beethoven
- Maria Magdalena Łubieńska (1833–1920), Polish artist
- Maria-Magdalena Rusu (born 1999), Romanian rower

== See also ==
- Maria Maddalena (disambiguation)
- Maria Maddalena de' Pazzi (disambiguation)
- Marie-Madeleine (disambiguation)
- Mary Magdalene (disambiguation)
- Marija Magdalena (disambiguation)
