= Gonfalon of Justice =

1501 painting by Pietro Perugino

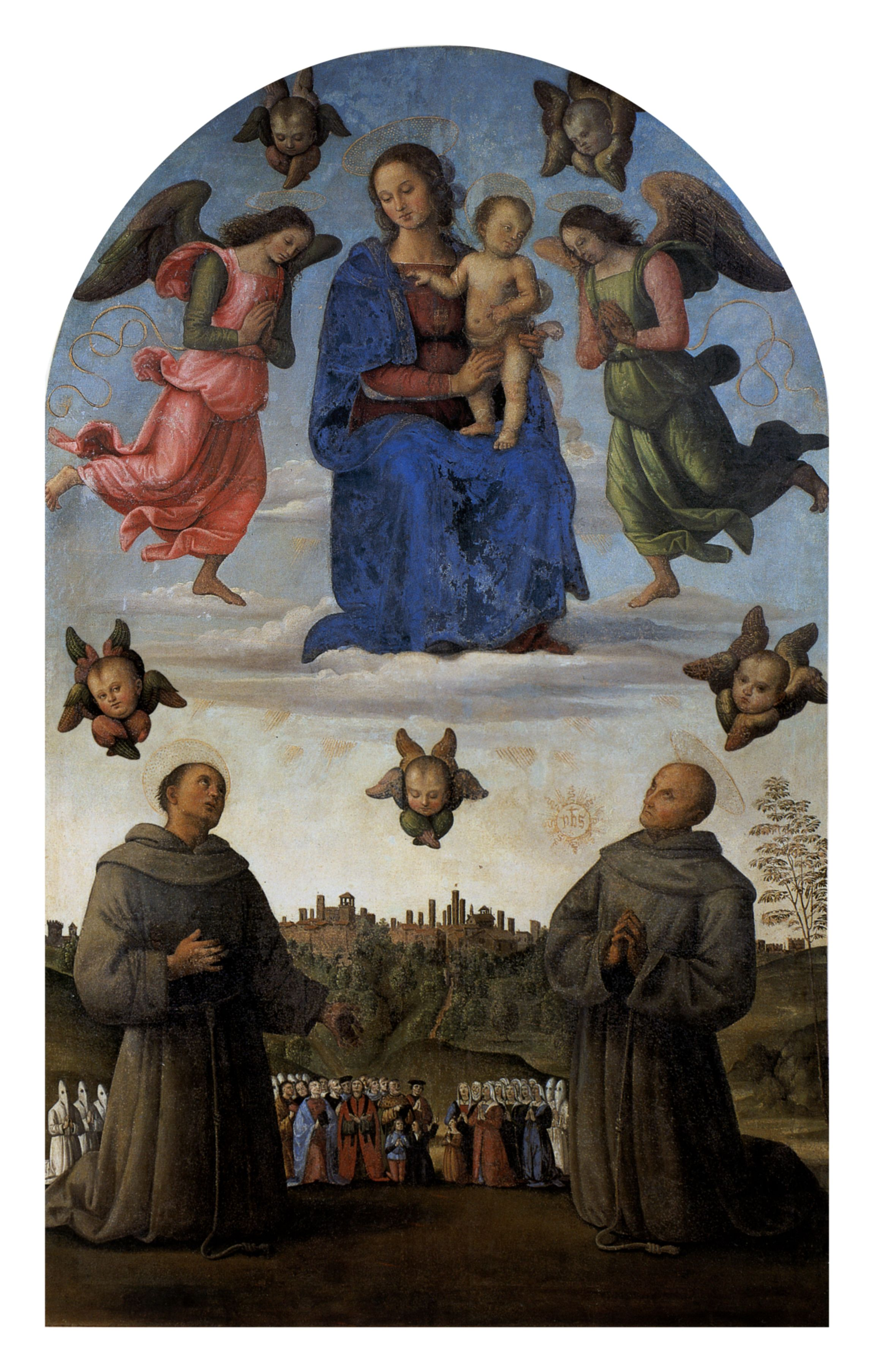
- Artist: Perugino
- Year: c. 1501
- Medium: tempera and oil on canvas
- Dimensions: 278 cm × 138 cm (109 in × 54 in)
- Location: Galleria Nazionale dell'Umbria, Perugia

The Gonfalon of Justice (Italian: Gonfalone della Giustizia) is a tempera and oil on canvas painting by Perugino, dating to around 1501 and now housed in the Galleria Nazionale dell'Umbria in Perugia.

It was commissioned as a gonfalon (banner for public processions) by the brothers of the Confraternity of Justice in Perugia. It dates to the artist's peak, just after the success of his cycle of paintings for the Sala delle Udienze del Collegio del Cambio, when he was working in both Florence and Perugia. It shows the Madonna and Child accompanied by angels and seraphim, with Francis of Assisi (with the stigmata) and Bernardino of Siena kneeling below them.

Between the two male saints is the Christogram 'IHS' in the foreground and a view of Perugia in the background, with its female citizens kneeling to the right, the male citizens to the left and other kneeling figures in the white habits of the Confraternity. The composition draws on the painter's assemblage of drawings, with the Madonna and Child similar to those in his 1497 Fano Altarpiece, the two symmetrical gilded angels to those in the San Francesco al Prato Resurrection, Madonna in Glory with Saints and Madonna della Consolazione, all dating to around 1501 like the Gonfalon.

== Bibliography ==
- (in Italian) Vittoria Garibaldi, Perugino, in Pittori del Rinascimento, Scala, Florence, 2004 ISBN 888117099X
- (in Italian) F. Santi, Gonfaloni umbri del Rinascimento, pérouse, 1976.
- Daniel Arasse, Faire croire. Modalités de la diffusion et de la réception des messages religieux du XIIe au XVe siècles, vol. Actes de table ronde de Rome, Publications de l'École française de Rome, coll. « Actes de table ronde de Rome (22-23 juin 1979) », June 1979, p. 145
