= Pinacoteca Nazionale di Bologna =

Art museum in Bologna, Italy

Coordinates: 44°29′52″N 11°21′12″E

National Art Gallery of Bologna Pinacoteca Nazionale di Bologna
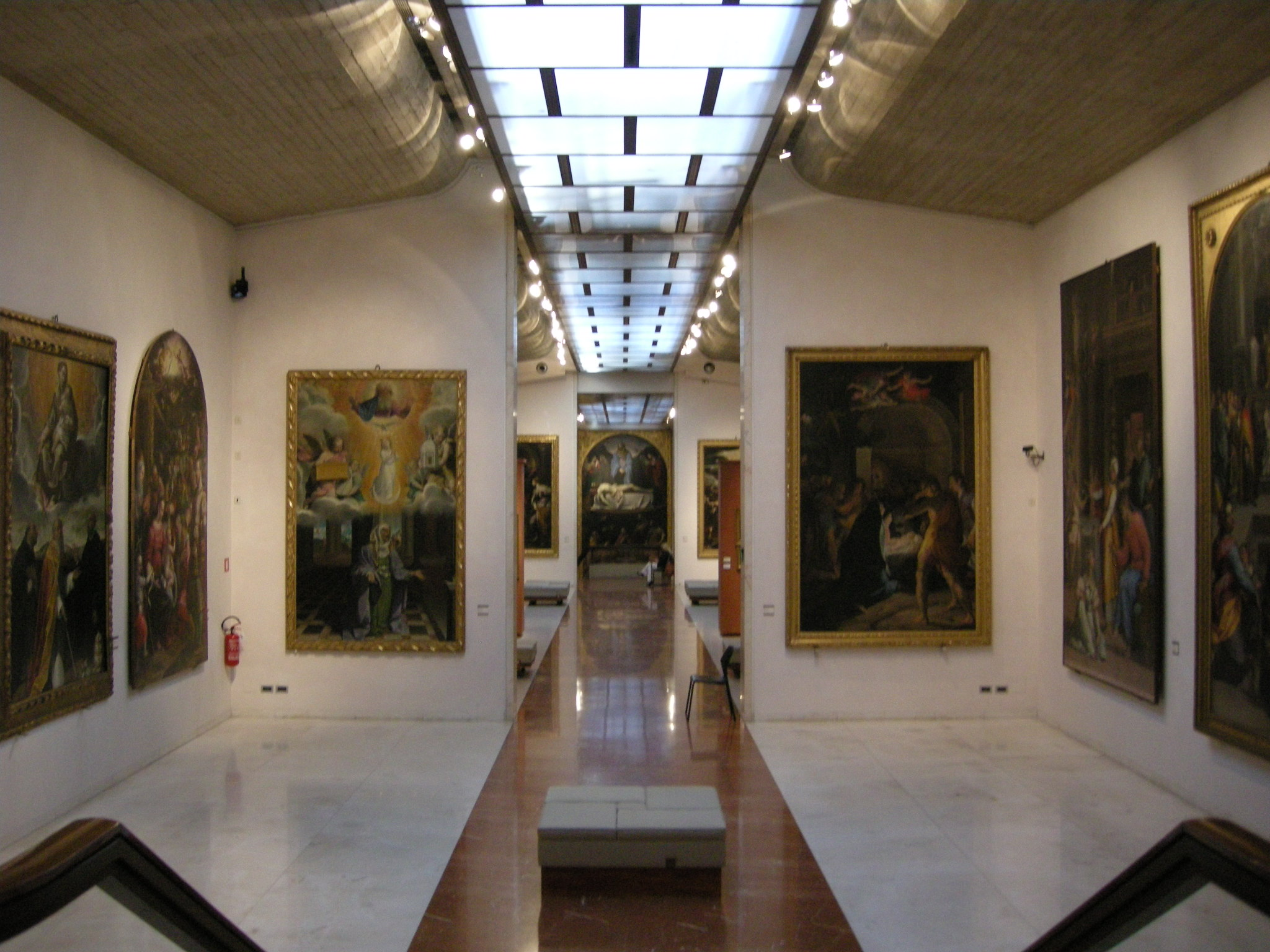
- Location: Via Belle Arti 56, 40126, Bologna Italy
- Type: Art Gallery
- Website: www.pinacotecabologna.beniculturali.it

The National Art Gallery of Bologna (Pinacoteca Nazionale di Bologna) is a museum in Bologna, Italy. It is located in the former Saint Ignatius Jesuit novitiate of the city's University district, and inside the same building that houses the Academy of Fine Arts. The museum offers a wide collection of Emilian paintings from the 13th to the 18th century and other fundamental works by artists who were in some way related to the city.

== History ==
=== Accademia Clementina ===
According to 18th-century Italian art historian Luigi Crespi, it was cardinal Prospero Lambertini, who would later become Pope Benedict XIV, the one who planned a Gallery for altarpieces in the churches of the city.

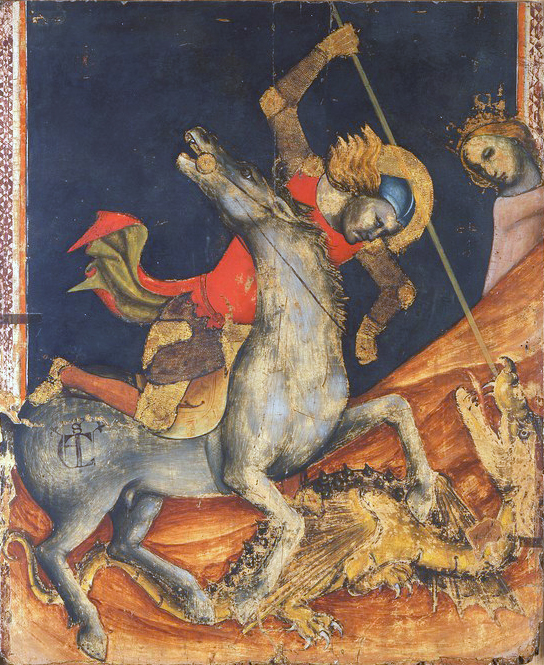
Saint George and the Dragon by Vitale da Bologna.

The gallery's first nucleus of works came from the acquisition in 1762 by monsignor Francesco Zambeccari of eight early 15th-century altarpieces, salvaged from the demolition of Saint Mary Magdalene's church. Bought for the Istituto delle Scienze, the art pieces were to be preserved by the Accademia Clementina, the Institute's artistic section. In 1776 a dozen of 13th-century altarpieces and Byzantine icons, which came from Urbano Savorgnan's legacy and formerly located at the Saint Philip Neri's Oratory, were also bought for the Accademia.

Another Bolognese conservation pole was the Appartamento del Gonfaloniere at the Palazzo Pubblico. From the late 16th century onwards, the Appartamento had been housing paintings from artists such as Vitale da Bologna, Raphael (The Ecstasy of St. Cecilia), Cima da Conegliano (Madonna and Child), Lorenzo Costa, Francesco Francia, Pietro Perugino (Madonna in Glory with Saints) and Annibale Carracci (Madonna and Child with Saints), alongside works like the Pala del Voto by Guido Reni, preserved there for their high civic significance (another painting by Reni in the museum is the Massacre of the Innocents, 1611.

=== Gallery of the Academy of Fine Arts ===
By 1796-1797, the Napoleonic occupation of Bologna and its incorporation into the Cispadane Republic led to the suppression of many convents, churches, and all the guilds. Paintings from many of these institutions were appropriated by the authorities. Some were looted and exported to other cities. The Bolognese senate decided to merge the suppressed churches' and convents' paintings and Accademia delle Scienze's holdings into one single collection, gathering almost one thousand works, organized first at the former Convent of St Vitalis, then in 1802 at the former Jesuit novitiate of Saint Ignatius in the Borgo della Paglia, now called via delle Belle Arti 56, made by Alfonso Torreggiani in 1726 to house the newly created gallery of National Academy of Fine Arts.

=== 19th and 20th centuries ===
With the fall of the Napoleonic empire in 1815, many works seized by the French were returned from the Louvre to the city. The first enlargement of the collection, carried out by Leandro Marconi dates back to this time. In 1826 Gaetano Giordani made the first catalog. The collection was enlarged again in 1844, when the museum now added the convent's chapel, which had ceiling frescoes depicting the Apotheosis of St Ignatius of Loyola. Between 1867 and 1868, many paintings coming from further suppressions were added. In 1875, the pinacoteca was opened regularly for the public, in 1882 the Gallery became autonomous and, in 1884 Zambeccari Collection was acquired.

In the first years of the 20th century another wing was built under the supervision of Edoardo Collamarini. In the late sixties under supervisor Cesare Gnudi and based on Leone Pancaldi's project, the Salone del Rinascimento was created to host the frescoes brought from the Sant'Apollonia di Mezzaratta church. In 1997 the Gallery was completely renovated to comply the European standards, and it is one of the best known Italian art galleries, internationally known and appreciated for its space dedicated exclusively to temporary exhibitions and for its educational activities.

== Gallery ==
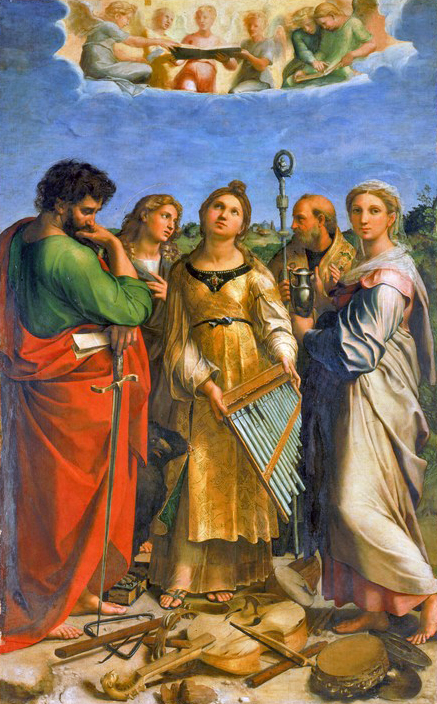
The Ecstasy of St. Cecilia, c. 1518 by Raphael.

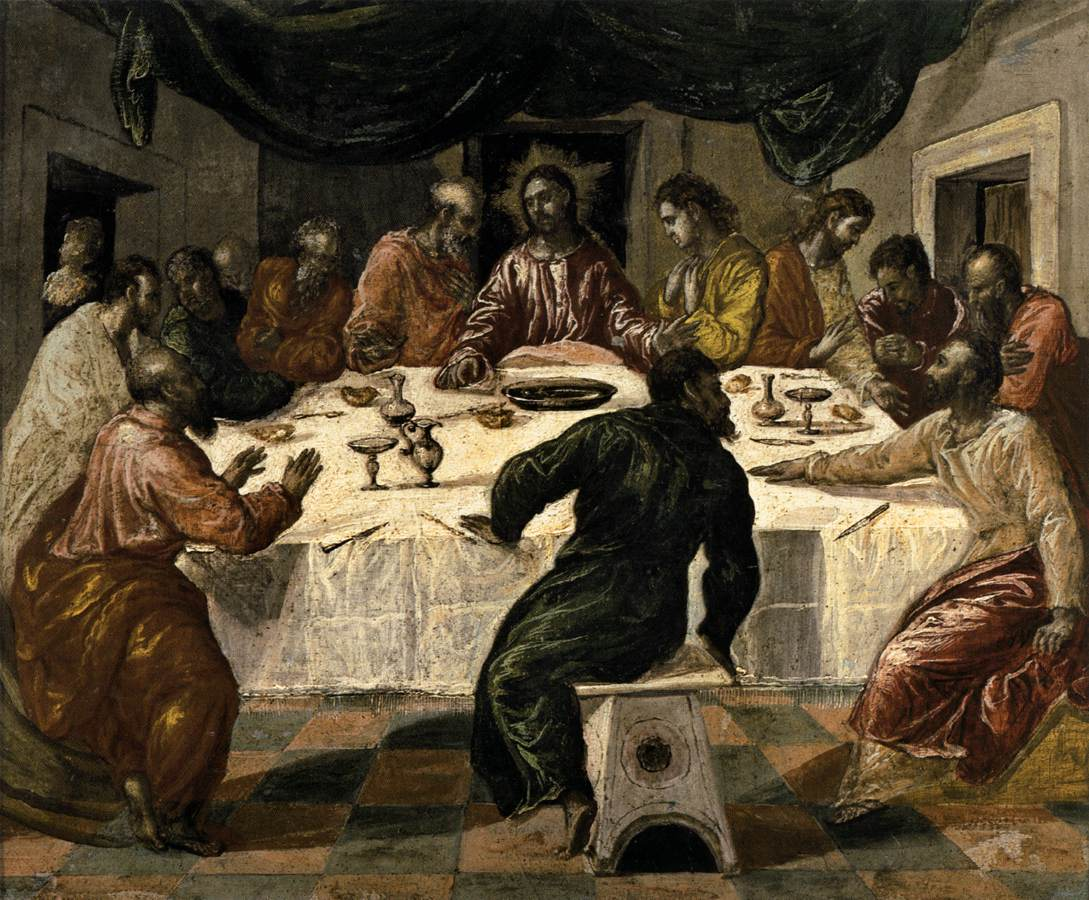
The Last Supper, c. 1568 by El Greco.

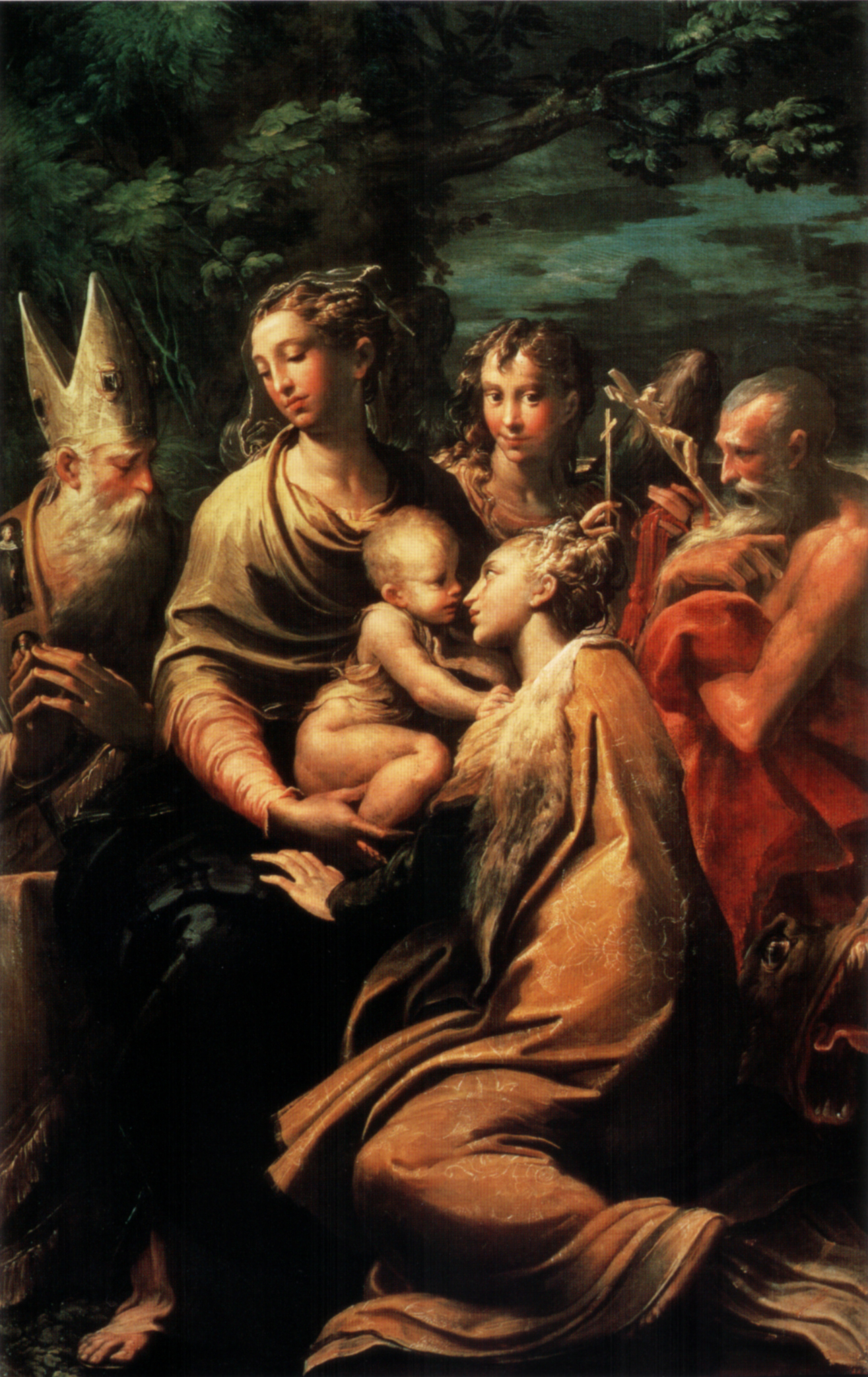
Madonna di Santa Margherita, c. 1520-1530 by Parmigianino.

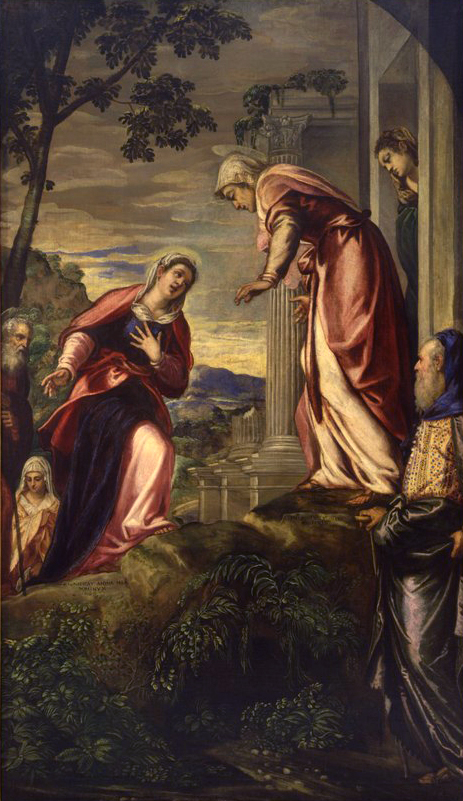
The Visitation, c. 1549 by Tintoretto

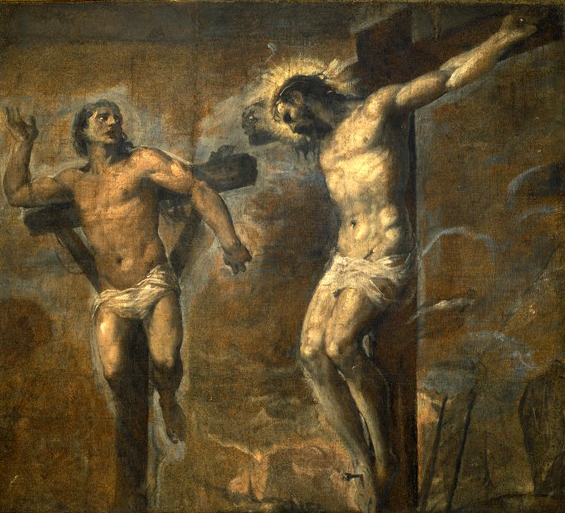
Christ and the Good Thief, c. 1566 by Titian.

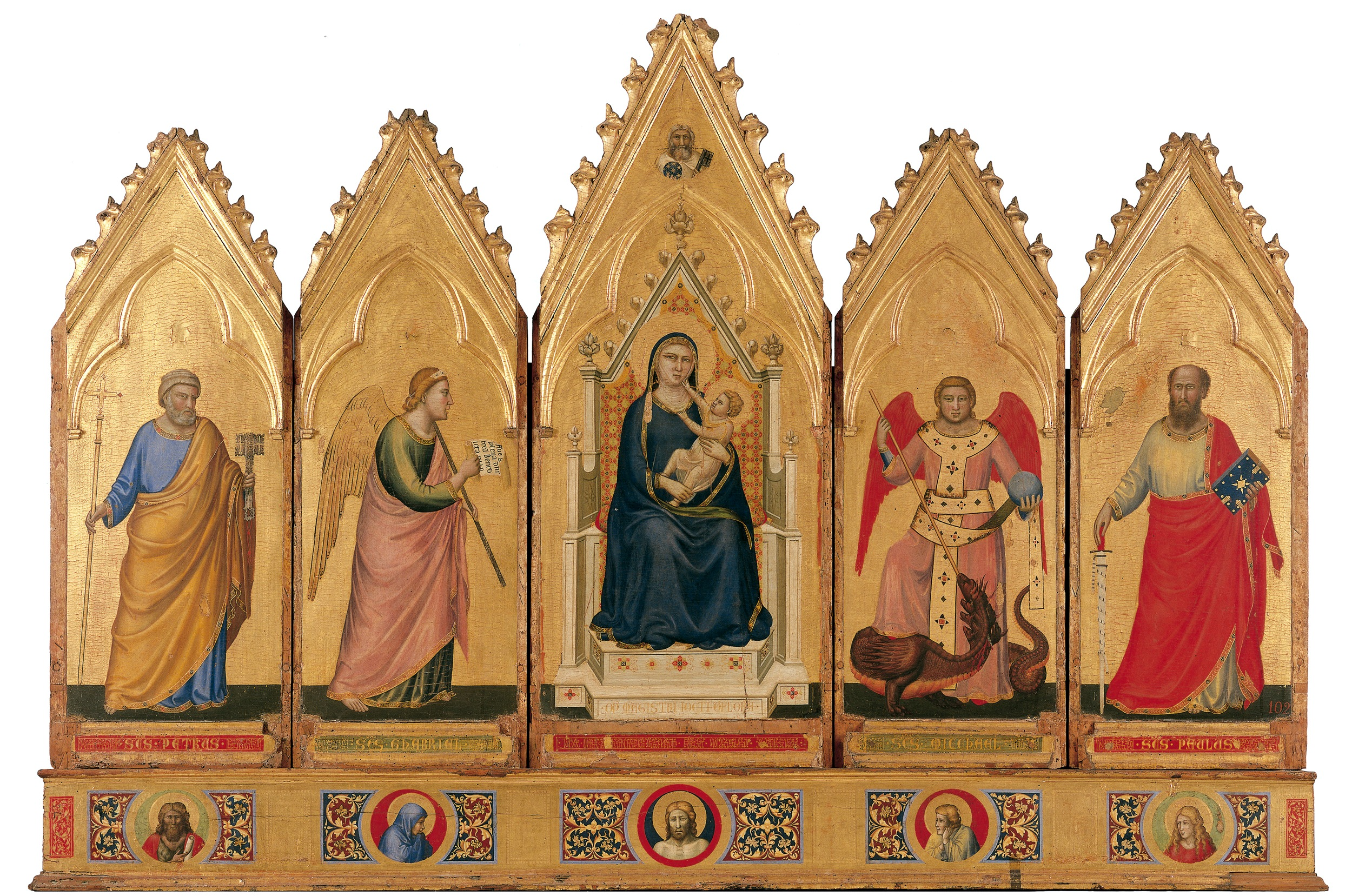
Bologna Polyptych, c. 1330 by Giotto.

== See also ==
- List of national galleries

== Sources ==
- G.P. Cammarota, La formazione della Pinacoteca Nazionale di Bologna, Bologna, volume I 1997, volume III 2000, volume II 2004.
- A. Emiliani, La Pinacoteca Nazionale di Bologna, Milano, 1997.
