= Mary Magdalene (Perugino) =

Painting by Pietro Perugino

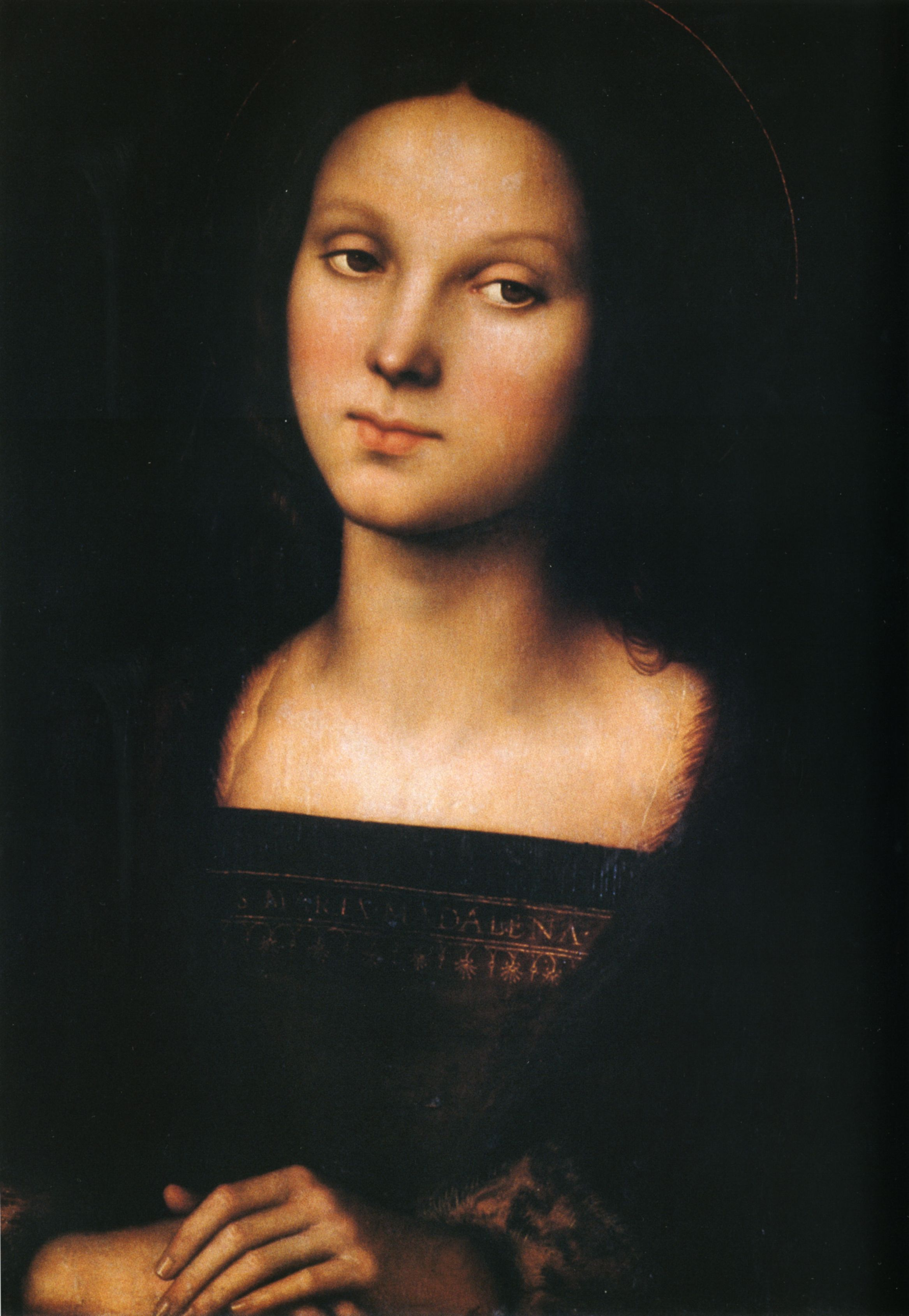
- Artist: Perugino
- Year: c. 1500
- Medium: oil on panel
- Dimensions: 47 cm × 34 cm (19 in × 13 in)
- Location: Galleria Palatina, Florence

Mary Magdalene is an oil on panel painting of Mary Magdalene, dating to around 1500 and now in the Galleria Palatina in Florence - it has featured in its inventory since 1641. It is now attributed to Perugino. It is modelled on his wife Chiara Fancelli, who also modelled for several of his Madonnas. It is comparable to his Madonna and Child with St John the Baptist and St Catherine of Alexandria (Louvre), of similar date and with a similar dark background.

In the inventory of 1691 it was attributed to Raphael. From 1695 onwards it was considered to be a pendant to Young Man with an Apple, generally attributed to Raphael. It was sent to Palermo from 1797 to 1803 as a work by Franciabigio, but around that time a new hypothesis suggested and popularized by Luigi Lanzi held it to be by Leonardo da Vinci. In the 1810, 1815 and 1829 inventories it was attributed to Giacomo Francia.

== Bibliography ==
- (in Italian) Vittoria Garibaldi, Perugino, in Pittori del Rinascimento, Scala, Florence, 2004 ISBN 888117099X
- (in Italian) Pierluigi De Vecchi, Elda Cerchiari, I tempi dell'arte, volume 2, Bompiani, Milan, 1999 ISBN 88-451-7212-0
- (in Italian) Stefano Zuffi, Il Quattrocento, Electa, Milan, 2004 ISBN 8837023154
- (in Italian) Entry on Polomuseale.firenze.it
