= Maria Maddalena =

Maria Maddalena or Santa Maria Maddalena may refer to:

- Mary Magdalene, St. Mary the Apostle
- Archduchess Maria Maddalena of Austria (1589–1631), Grand Duchess of Tuscany
- Maria Maddalena de' Medici (1600–1633), Tuscan princess
- Maddalena de' Medici (1473–1528)

== See also ==
- Santa Maria Maddalena (disambiguation)
- Maria Maddalena de' Pazzi (disambiguation)
- Maria Magdalena (disambiguation)
- Mary Magdalene (disambiguation)
- Marie-Madeleine (disambiguation)
- Maria-Magdalena (disambiguation)
- Maria (disambiguation)
- Maddalena (disambiguation)
