= Madonna and Child with Saints John the Baptist and Catherine of Alexandria (Perugino) =

Painting by Pietro Perugino

Madonna and Child with St John the Baptist and St Catherine of Alexandria
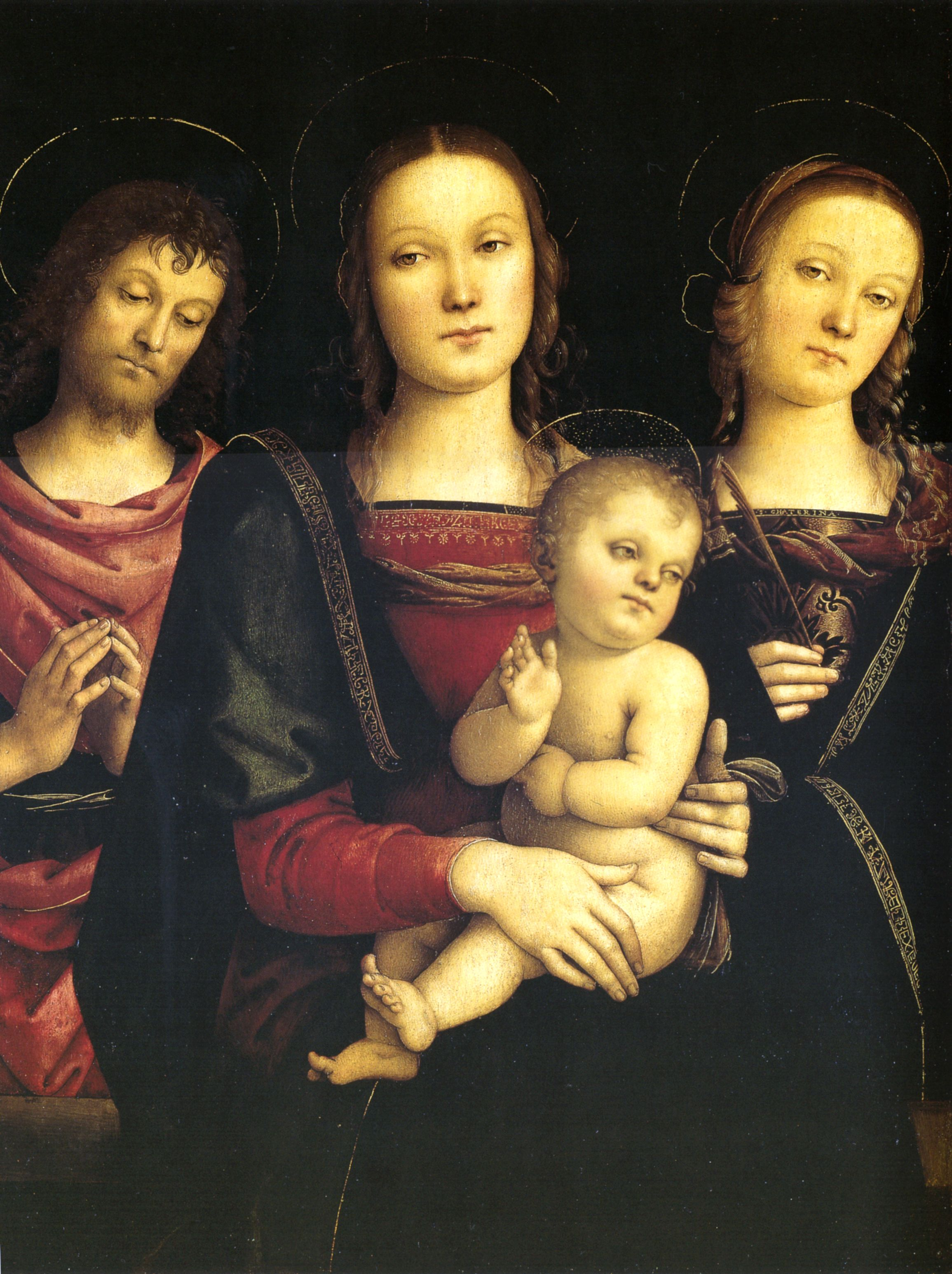
- Artist: Perugino
- Year: 1495–1500
- Medium: oil on panel
- Dimensions: 81 cm × 63 cm (32 in × 25 in)
- Location: Louvre, Paris

Madonna and Child with St John the Baptist and St Catherine of Alexandria is a c. 1495 oil on panel painting by Perugino of the Madonna and Child with John the Baptist and Catherine of Alexandria. It is now in the Louvre in Paris.

It was produced using the same cartoon as Madonna and Child with Two Saints (Kunsthistorisches Museum) and Madonna and Child with the Infant John the Baptist (Städel Museum), with very little variation between the three works. The face of the Madonna is based on Perugino's wife Chiara Fancelli

== Bibliography ==
- (in Italian) Vittoria Garibaldi, Perugino, in Pittori del Rinascimento, Scala, Florence, 2004 ISBN 888117099X
- (in Italian) Pierluigi De Vecchi, Elda Cerchiari, I tempi dell'arte, volume 2, Bompiani, Milan, 1999. ISBN 88-451-7212-0
- (in Italian) Stefano Zuffi, Il Quattrocento, Electa, Milan, 2004. ISBN 8837023154
