= Jan van Scorel =

Dutch painter (1495–1562)

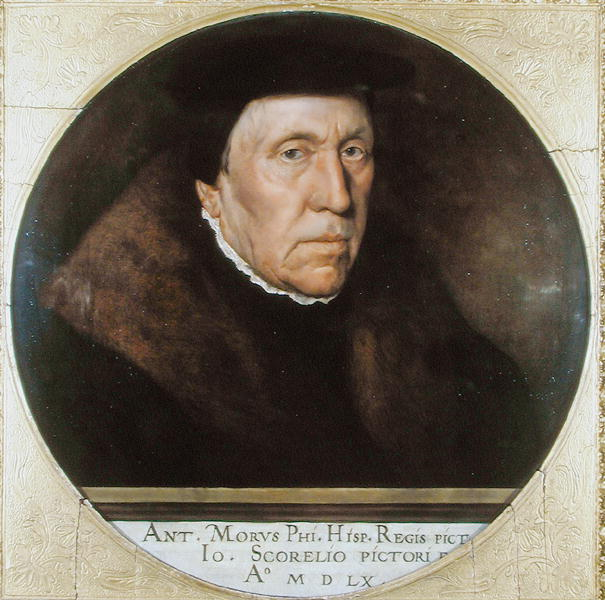
Portrait of Jan van Scorel by Antonis Mor (1560)

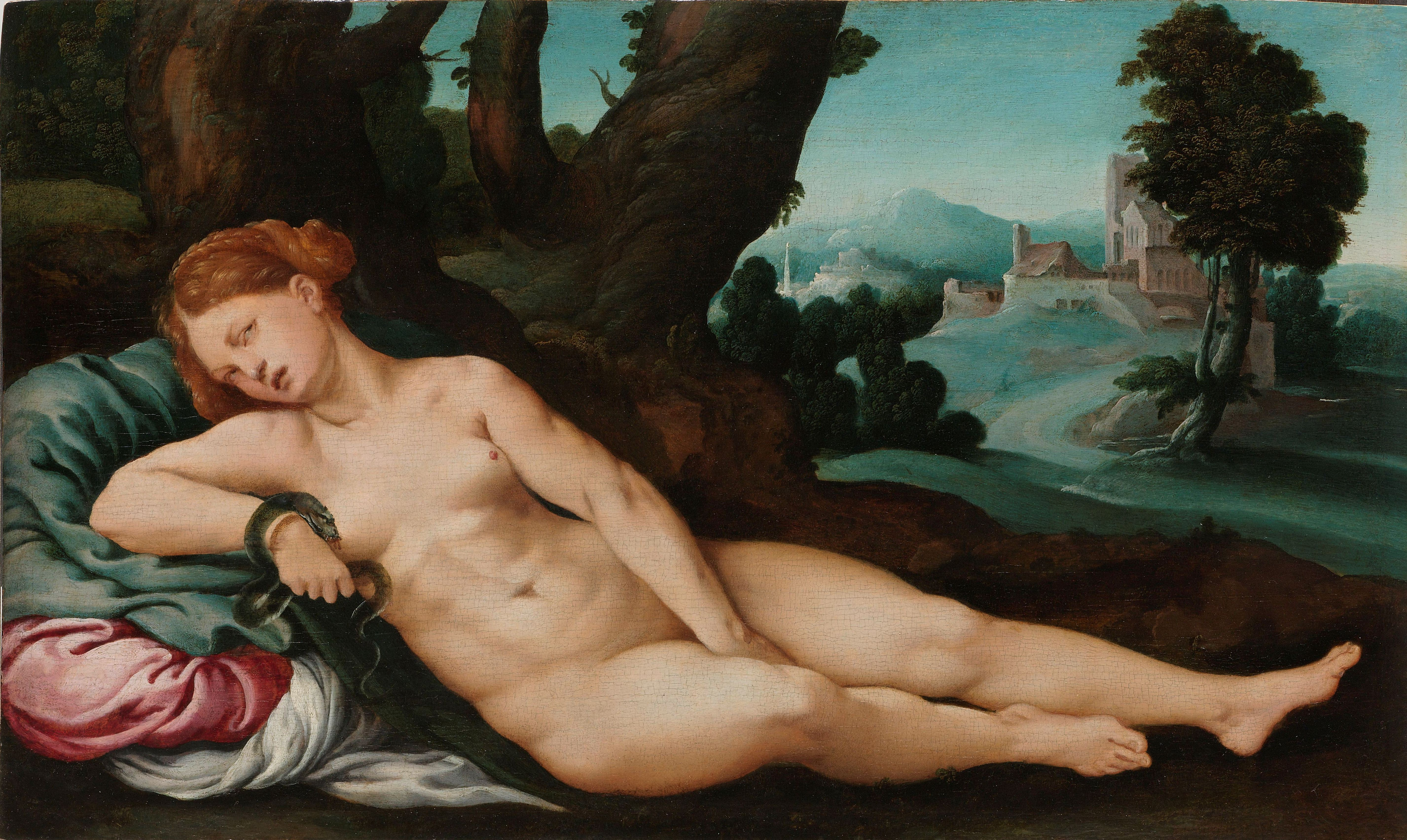
The dying Cleopatra (c.1522)

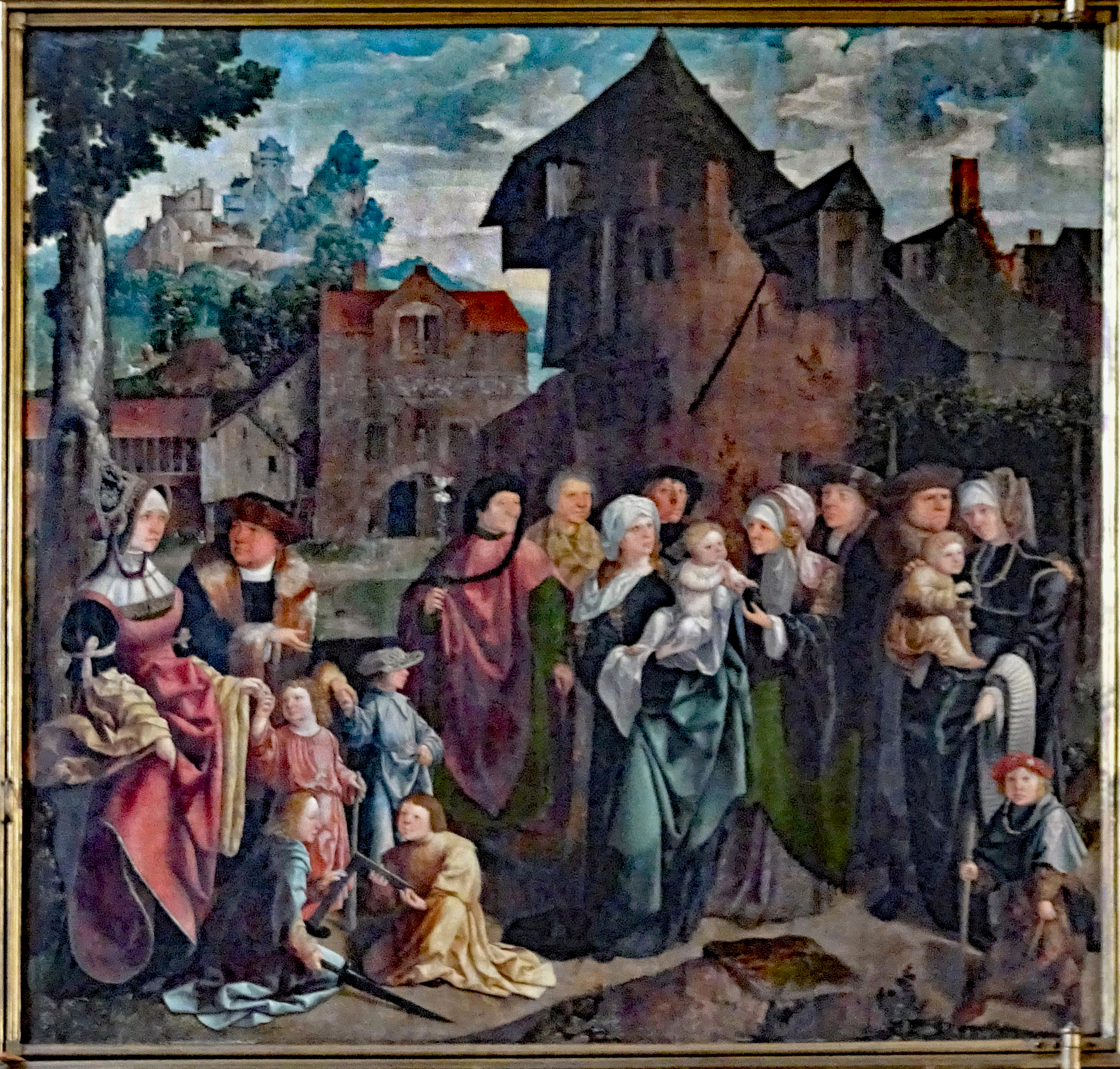
Obervellach, St.Martin's church, Frangipani-Altar

Jan van Scorel (1 August 1495 – 6 December 1562) was a Dutch painter, who played a leading role in introducing aspects of Italian Renaissance painting into Dutch and Flemish Renaissance painting. He was one of the early painters of the Romanist style who had spent a number of years in Italy, where he thoroughly absorbed the Italian style of painting. His trip to Italy coincided with the brief reign of the only Dutch pope in history, Adrian VI in 1522–23. The pope made him a court painter and superintendent of his collection of antiquities. His stay in Italy lasted from 1518 to 1524 and he also visited Nuremberg, Venice and Jerusalem. Venetian art had an important impact on the development of his style.

He differed from most Romanists in that he was a native of the northern Netherlands and not of Flanders and that he remained most of his life in the northern Netherlands. He settled permanently in Utrecht in 1530 and established a large workshop on the Italian model. The workshop mainly produced altarpieces, many of which were destroyed in the Reformation iconoclasm in the years just after his death. He also held clerical appointments. This did not stop him from having a long-time relationship with a mistress who may have modelled for some of his female figures.

== Biography ==
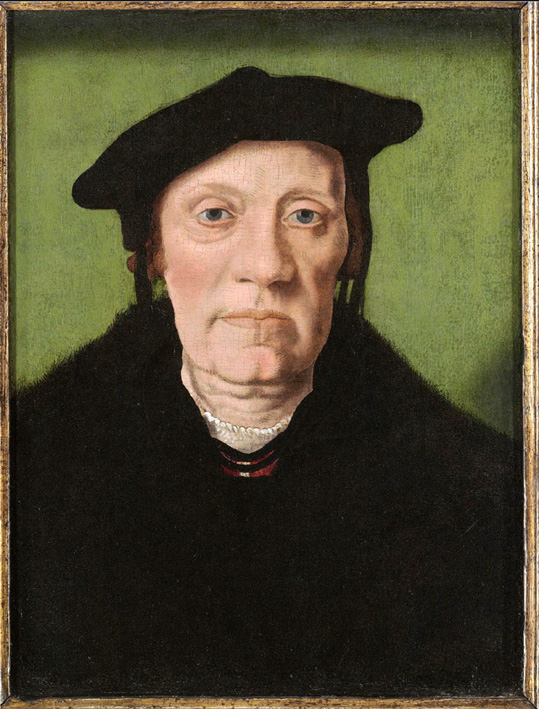
Cornelis Aerentsz van der Dussen (c. 1535)

Van Scorel was born in Schoorl, north of Alkmaar and close to Egmond Abbey. It is not known whether he began his studies under the Master of Alkmaar, Pieter Gerritsz in Haarlem, Jacob Cornelisz in Amsterdam, or with Jan Gossaert in Utrecht, but it is certain that the last two were the master painters he would meet later in his life and who would have the greatest effect on his technique. Van Scorel is recorded in Haarlem in 1517 where he perhaps collaborated with his contemporary Maarten van Heemskerck, who like him, had been born close to Alkmaar (they certainly collaborated in Haarlem in 1528).

In 1524 Jan Gossaert is recorded at Duurstede Castle, near Utrecht, where Jan van Scorel was his pupil. Van Scorel began traveling through Europe in his early twenties after visiting Utrecht. In 1518–22 he is registered in Venice, and along the way, heading to Nuremberg and then on via Austria over the Alps. In the village of Obervellach in 1520, he completed his first representative work, the "Frangipani-Altar" in St. Martin's church. Giorgione was a considerable influence on Van Scorel during his tenure in Venice. After leaving Venice, Van Scorel was in Rome from 1522 to 1524 and made a pilgrimage to the Holy Land. His experiences in Jerusalem are depicted in many of his later works. Perhaps Van Scorel's example encouraged Van Heemskerck to travel to Rome himself later.

In 1521, Van Scorel returned to Rome where he met the Dutch pope Pope Adrian VI, who he may have met earlier in Utrecht. The pope appointed him painter to the Vatican. The pope sat for a portrait by Van Scorel. Van Scorel underwent the influence of Michelangelo and Raphael and succeeded Raphael as Keeper of the Belvedere.

Upon his return to the Netherlands in 1524, he settled in Utrecht where he began a successful career as a painter and a teacher. Van Scorel was a very educated man and skilled as an engineer and an architect, as well as an artist. He was also multi-lingual, no doubt as a result of his travels. He made the plans for building a polder in his native North Holland, called the Zijpe- en Hazepolder, that was later financed by his friend from Antwerp, the merchant Servaes de Haese. Perhaps because of the work on this polder, he is registered in Haarlem in 1528, where he collaborated with Heemskerck and assisted with the school there that Dirck Volckertszoon Coornhert would later run.

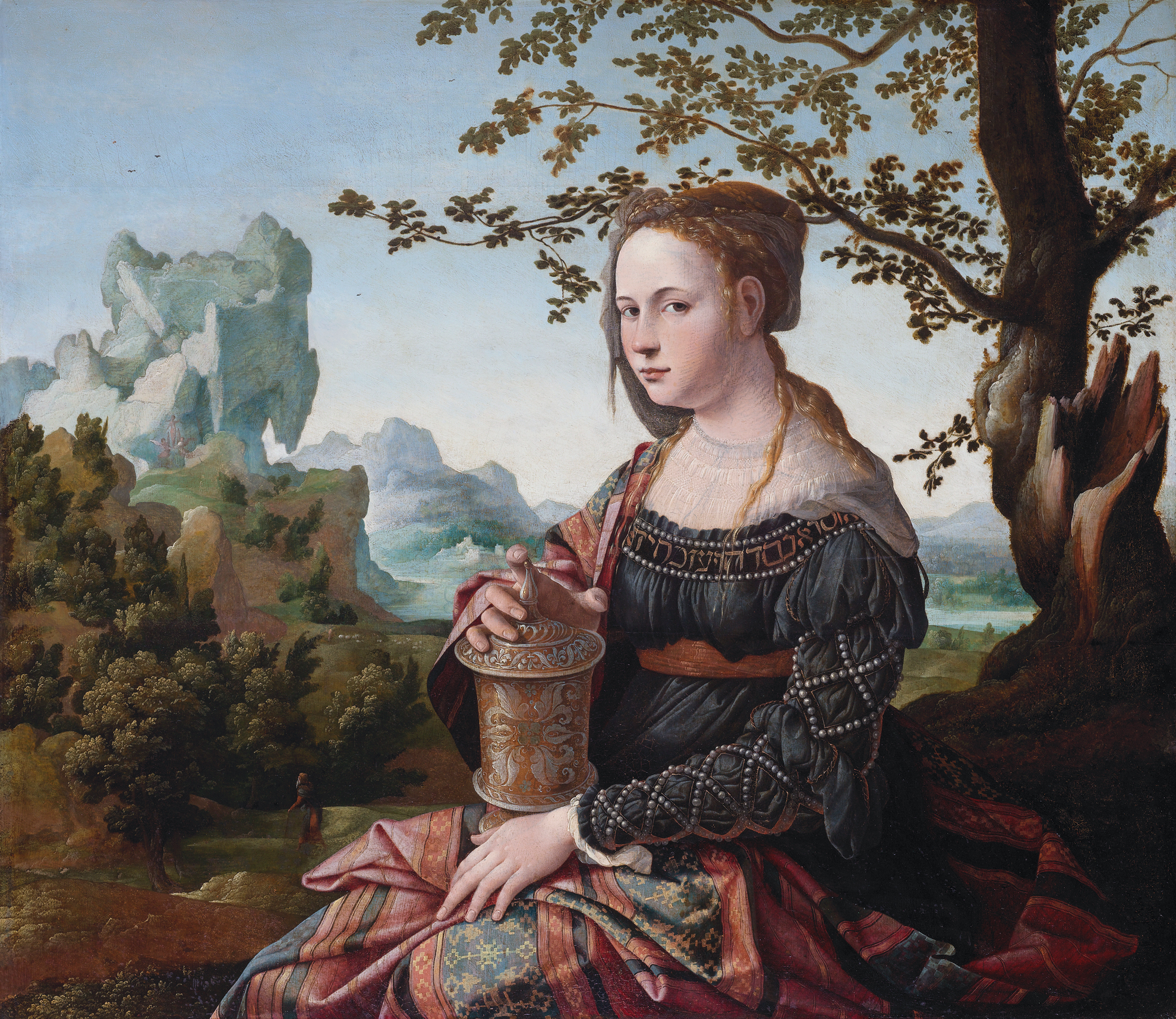
Mary Magdalene, circa 1530

Considered to be the leading Netherlandish Romanist, Van Scorel moved to Ghent for painting contracts before returning to Utrecht for the same reason, where he died in 1562, leaving behind a wealth of portraits and altarpieces. Though many of his works fell victim to the Iconoclasm in 1566, some still remain and can be seen primarily at museums in the Netherlands.

== Influences ==
Contemporary painters that Van Scorel may have met, taught, and/or collaborated with, are Cornelis Willemsz (1481–1552), Aertgen van Leyden, the Master of Alkmaar (or Cornelis Buys), Pieter Gerritsz, Jacob Cornelisz, Jan Gossaert, Maarten van Heemskerck, Antonis Mor, Lambert Sustris, Master of the Good Samaritan, and Martin Schermus van Deventer. He also was the teacher of the painter Michel Coxie whom he took to Italy with him in 1532 for seven years. Coxie & van Scorel returned to Mechlan in 1539 and brought with them the influence of Michelangelo, Raphael, and Leonardo. Coxie in particular was known as a colorist and it was his works that were studied by the young Rubens.

== Public collections ==
- Centraal Museum, Utrecht
- Museum Catharijneconvent, Utrecht
- Museum Boijmans Van Beuningen, Rotterdam
- Rijksmuseum Amsterdam
