= Tezi Altarpiece =

Painting by Pietro Perugino

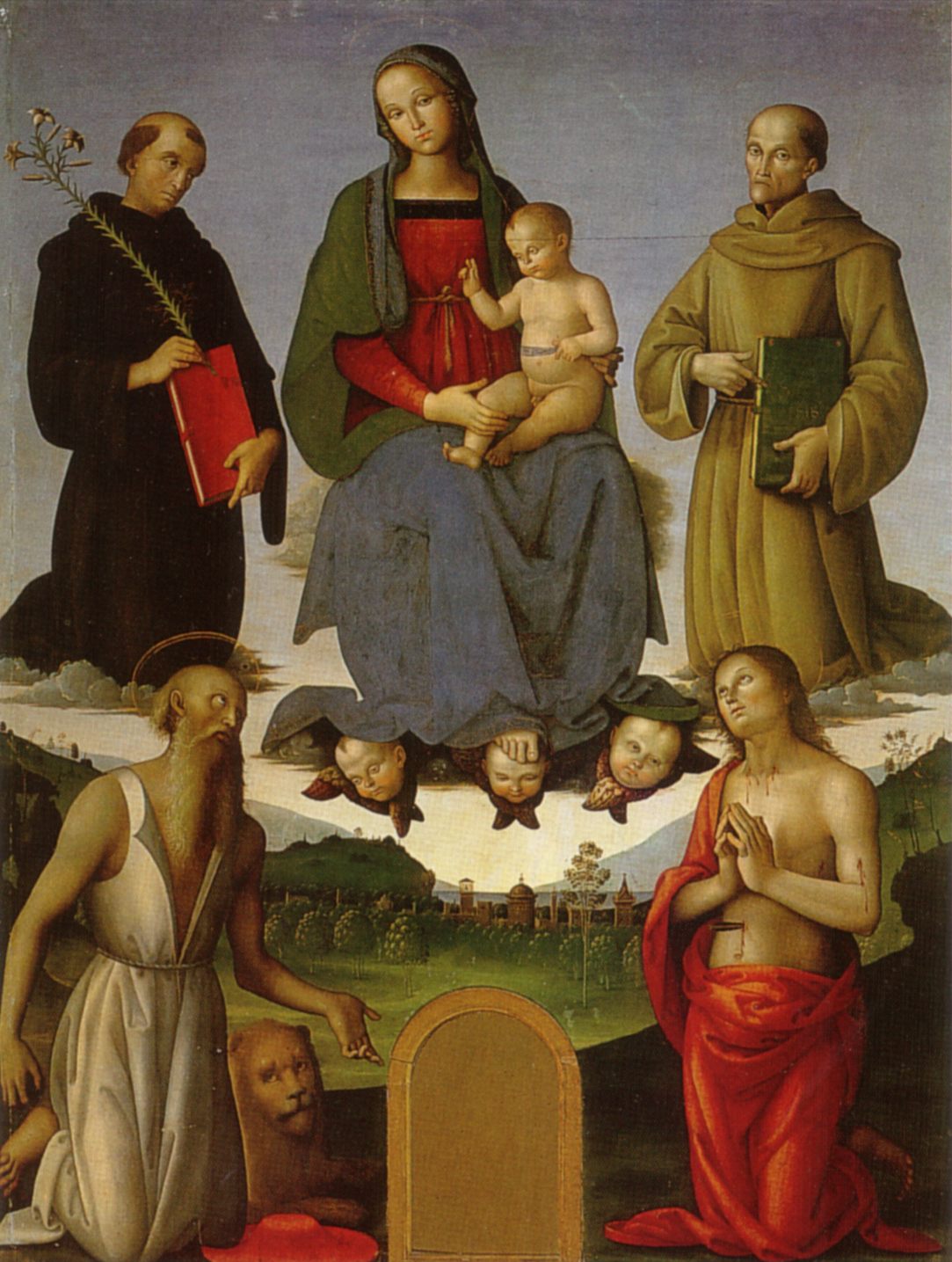
- Artist: Pietro Perugino and workshop
- Year: c. 1500
- Medium: Oil on panel
- Dimensions: 180 cm × 158 cm (71 in × 62 in)
- Location: Galleria Nazionale dell'Umbria, Perugia, Italy

The Tezi Altarpiece (Italian: Pala Tezi) is a painting by the Italian Renaissance painter Pietro Perugino, housed in the Galleria Nazionale dell'Umbria of Perugia, Italy. The work was once associated to a single predella panel portraying the Last Supper (18 cm × 121 cm or 7.1 in × 47.6 in), now at the Gemäldegalerie of Berlin.

The painting was executed for the Tezi Chapel in the church of Sant'Agostino in Perugia. After that monastic institute was suppressed under the Napoleonic domination of Italy, it was acquired by the Umbrian Gallery.

== Style ==
The panel shows the Madonna and Child on a cloud in the sky, flanked by St. Nicholas of Tolentino and Bernardino of Siena. Below, over a wood landscape, are the traditional depictions of St. Jerome with the lion, and St. Sebastian struck by arrows. At the bottom, in the middle, is a tabernacle opening which once housed the Holy Sacrament.

The Madonna is taken from the same cartoon used by Perugino for the Madonna of the Consolation, from the same period. Also, the use of colors is not typical of Perugino, and the work was perhaps executed mostly by his workshop, with the master adding just some touches.

== Sources ==
- Garibaldi, Vittoria (2004). "Perugino". Pittori del Rinascimento. Florence: Scala. ISBN 888117099X.
