= Madonna and Child with Saints (Annibale Carracci, 1590) =

Painting by Annibale Carracci

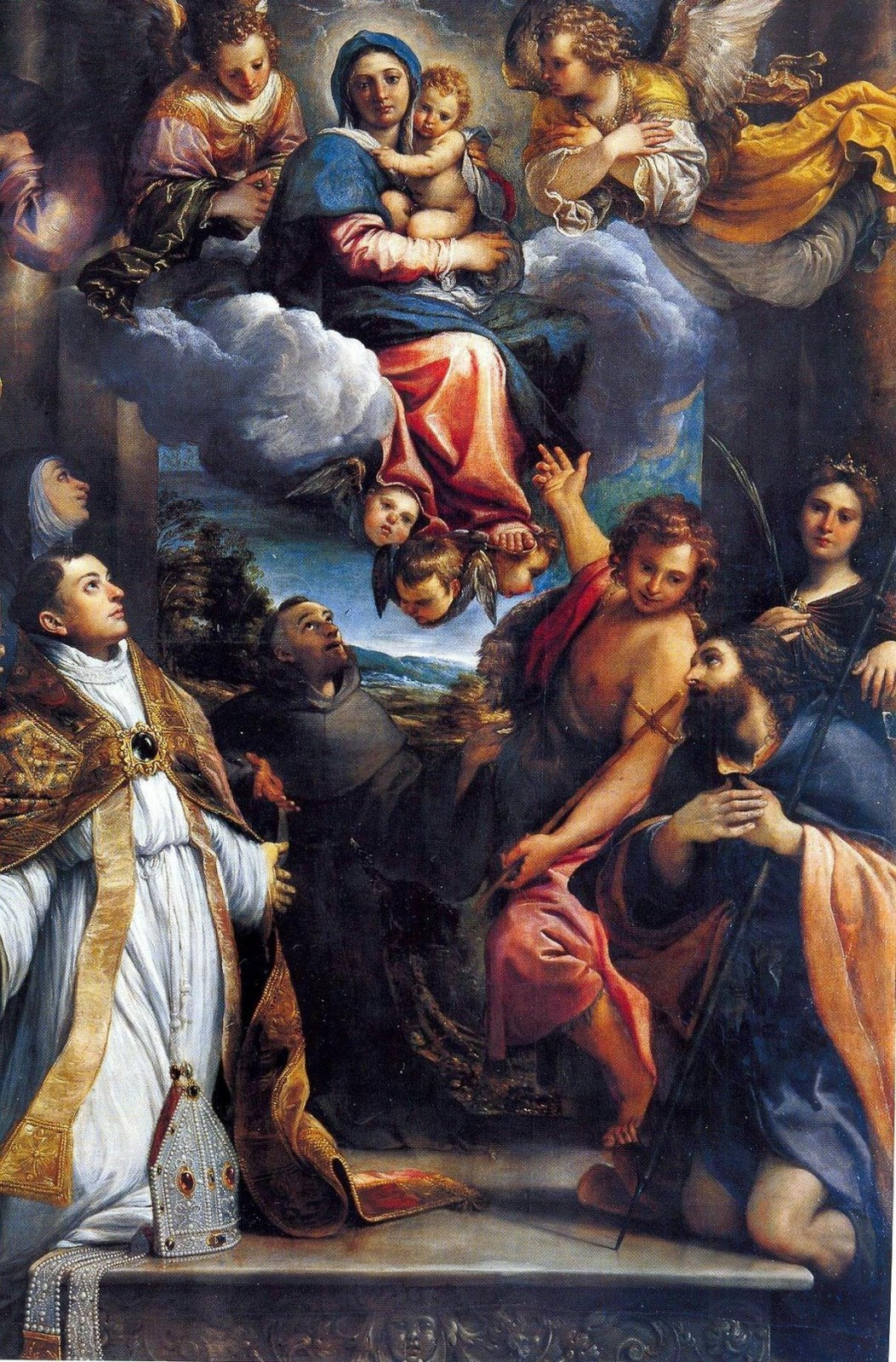
Madonna and Child with Saints (1590–1592)

Madonna and Child with Saints is a 1590-1592 oil on canvas painting by Annibale Carracci, now in the Pinacoteca Nazionale di Bologna.

The painting was made for the church of the now deconsecrated Franciscan Monastery of Santi Ludovico e Alessio, located on Via del Pratello, in Bologna. It depicts the Virgin above seated on a cloud in glory with her infant Jesus, while below gather, from left to right, Saints Clare of Assisi, Louis IX of France, Francis of Assisi, a young John the Baptist, Alexius of Rome, and Catherine of Alexandria.
