= Marie-Victoire Davril =

French artist (1755–1820)

Marie-Victoire Davril (sometimes d'Avril or Davrel) (1755–1820) was a French portrait painter.

Born in Paris, Davril was a pupil of Adélaïde Labille-Guiard, and exhibited in 1783 at the Salon de la Correspondance and the place Dauphine; at the former a miniature portrait of her by Marie-Madeleine Frémy. She appears to have been close to her fellow pupil Marie-Gabrielle Capet, being remembered in the latter's will. She was the universal heiress of wine merchant Edmé-Jean Cottin; the couple were not married, but were evidently closely connected, although the exact nature of their relationship remains unknown. Davril died at Guibeville. A posthumous inventory was taken, finding a number of artworks as well as furniture and 4410 francs in cash. Davril was active in oil paint, pastel, and miniatures during her career.
