= Madonna and Child (Cima, Bologna) =

Painting by Cima da Conegliano

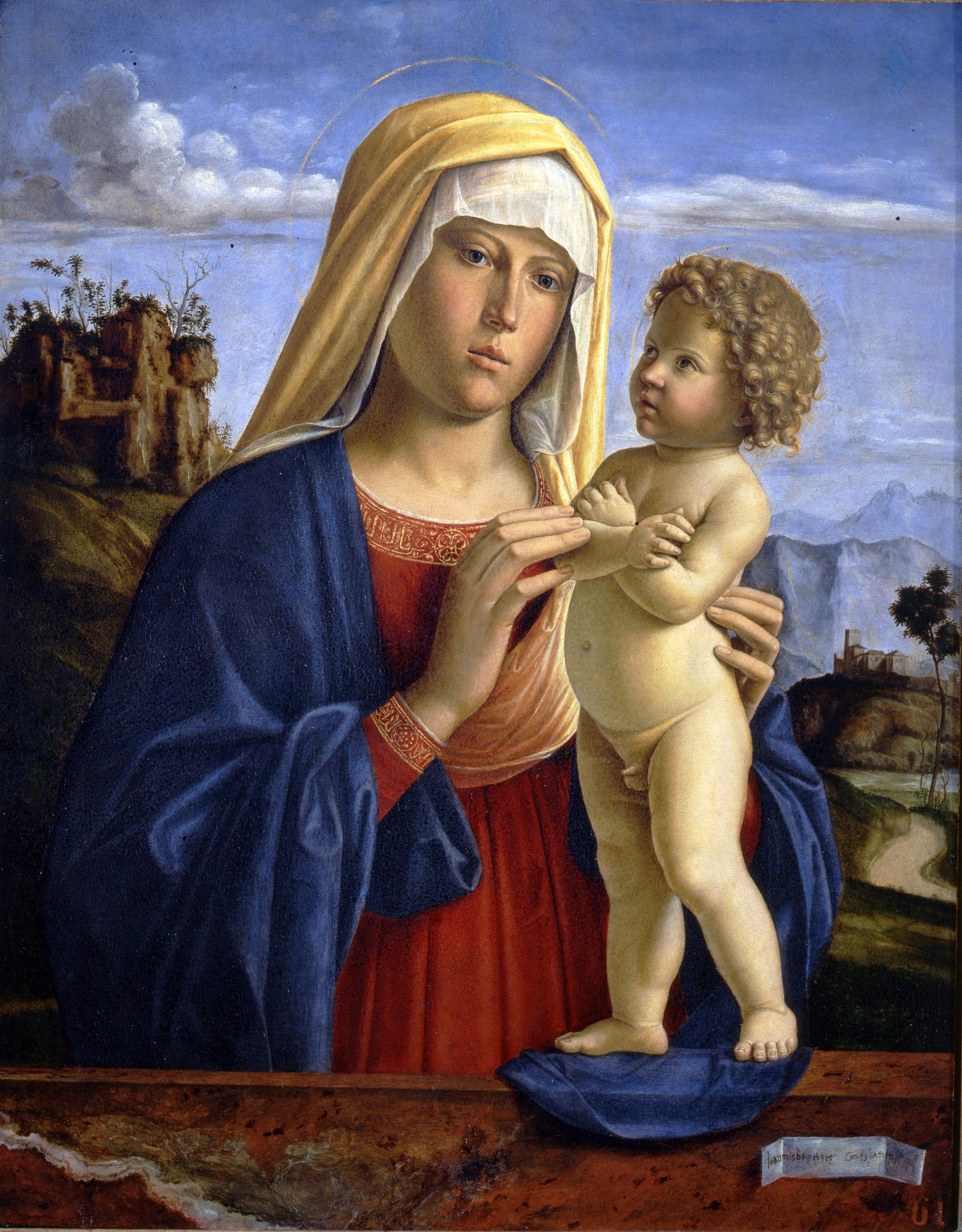
The Bologna painting

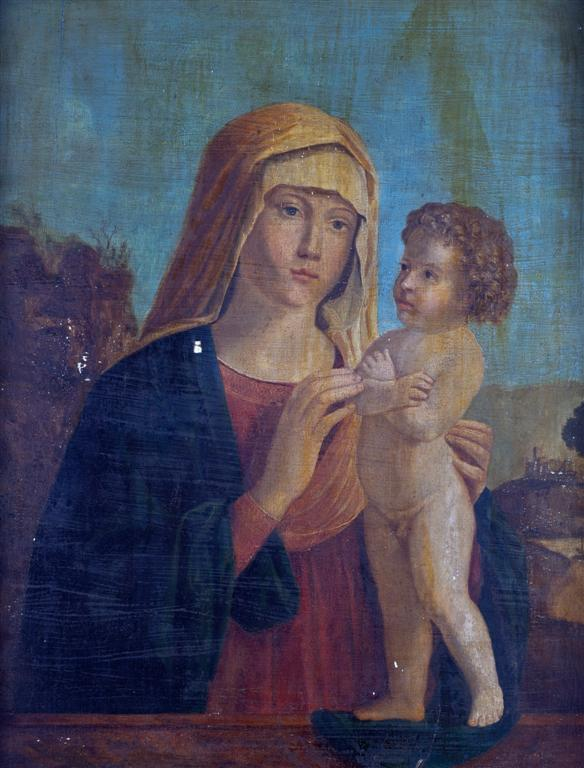
The Bath copy

Madonna and Child is an oil-on-panel painting by the Italian Renaissance painter Cima da Conegliano, created in 1495, now in the Pinacoteca Nazionale di Bologna. A studio copy also survives in the Holburne Museum in Bath, Somerset, United Kingdom.
