= Guibeville =

Commune in Île-de-France, France

- Commune
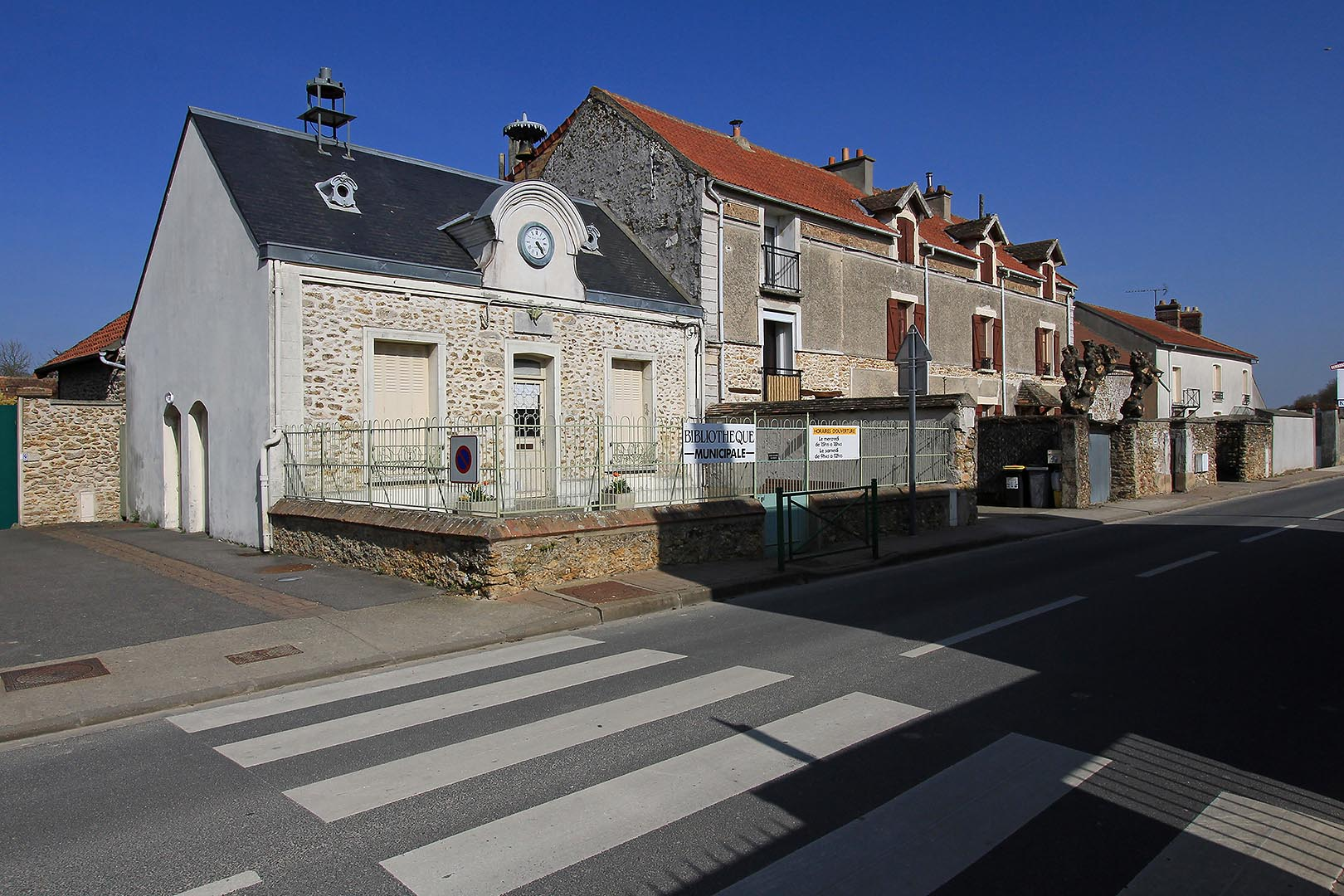
- The municipal library, in Guibeville
- Location of Guibeville
- Location within France Location within Île-de-France (region)
- Coordinates: 48°34′11″N 2°16′10″E
- Country: France
- Region: Île-de-France
- Department: Essonne
- Arrondissement: Palaiseau
- Canton: Arpajon
- Intercommunality: CA Cœur d'Essonne

Government
  - Mayor (2020–2026): Michel Collet
- Area^{1}: 2.61 km^{2} (1.01 sq mi)
- Highest elevation: 90 m (300 ft)
- Lowest elevation: 84 m (276 ft)
- Population (2023): 923
  - Density: 354/km^{2} (916/sq mi)
- Time zone: UTC+01:00 (CET)
  - Summer (DST): UTC+02:00 (CEST)
- INSEE/Postal code: 91292 /91630
- ^{1} French Land Register data, which excludes lakes, ponds, glaciers > 1 km^{2} (0.386 sq mi or 247 acres) and river estuaries.

Guibeville (French: [gibvil]) is a commune in the Essonne department in Île-de-France in northern France.

Inhabitants of Guibeville are known as Guibevillois.

Painter Marie-Victoire Davril died at her country house in Guibeville.

== See also ==
- Communes of the Essonne department
