= Madonna and Child with the Infant John the Baptist (Perugino) =

Painting by Pietro Perugino

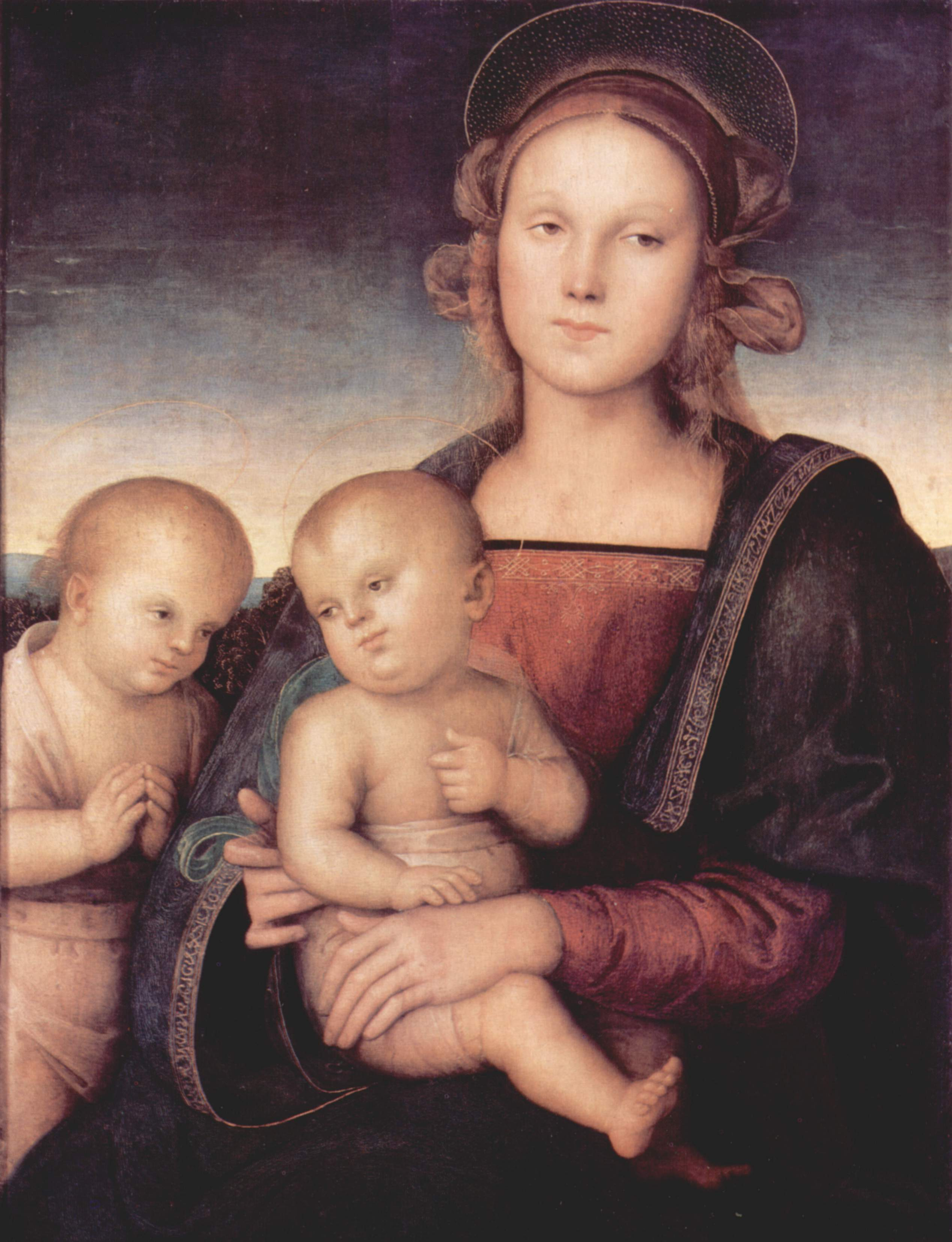
- Artist: Perugino
- Year: c. 1497
- Medium: oil on oak panel
- Dimensions: 73 cm × 52 cm (29 in × 20 in)
- Location: Städel Museum, Frankfurt

Madonna and Child with the Infant John the Baptist is an oil on oak panel painting by Perugino, dating to around 1497 and now in the Städel Museum in Frankfurt-am-Main.

== Bibliography (in Italian) ==
- Vittoria Garibaldi, Perugino, in Pittori del Rinascimento, Scala, Florence, 2004 ISBN 88-8117-099-X
- Pierluigi De Vecchi, Elda Cerchiari, I tempi dell'arte, volume 2, Bompiani, Milan, 1999. ISBN 88-451-7212-0
- Stefano Zuffi, Il Quattrocento, Electa, Milan, 2004. ISBN 88-370-2315-4
