= Mary Magdalene (Vouet) =

Painting by Simon Vouet

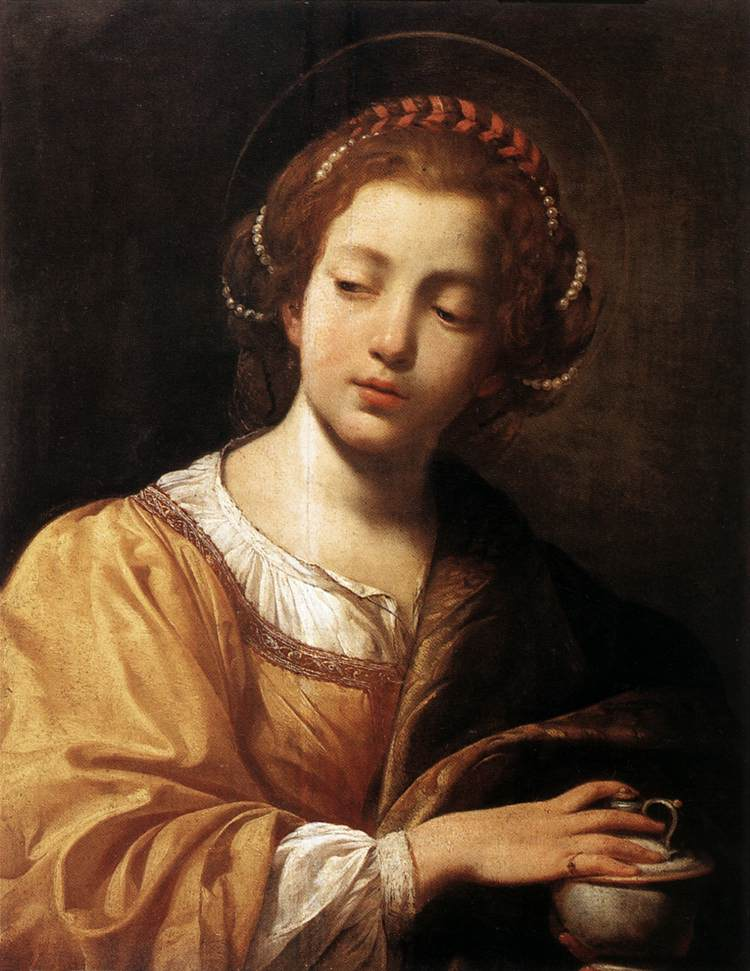
Mary Magdalene (1614–1615) by Simon Vouet

Mary Magdalene is an oil-on-wood painting executed in 1614–1615 by the French artist Simon Vouet. It is displayed in the Quirinal Palace in Rome.

It represents Mary Magdalene, recognizable by one of her iconographic attributes, the perfume glass, which alludes to the episode attributed to her in which she perfumed Jesus shortly before his execution.

== Sources ==
- http://www.lahornacina.com/dossiermagdalena.htm
