= Marie-Madeleine Bonafon =

French novelist (1716–1770)

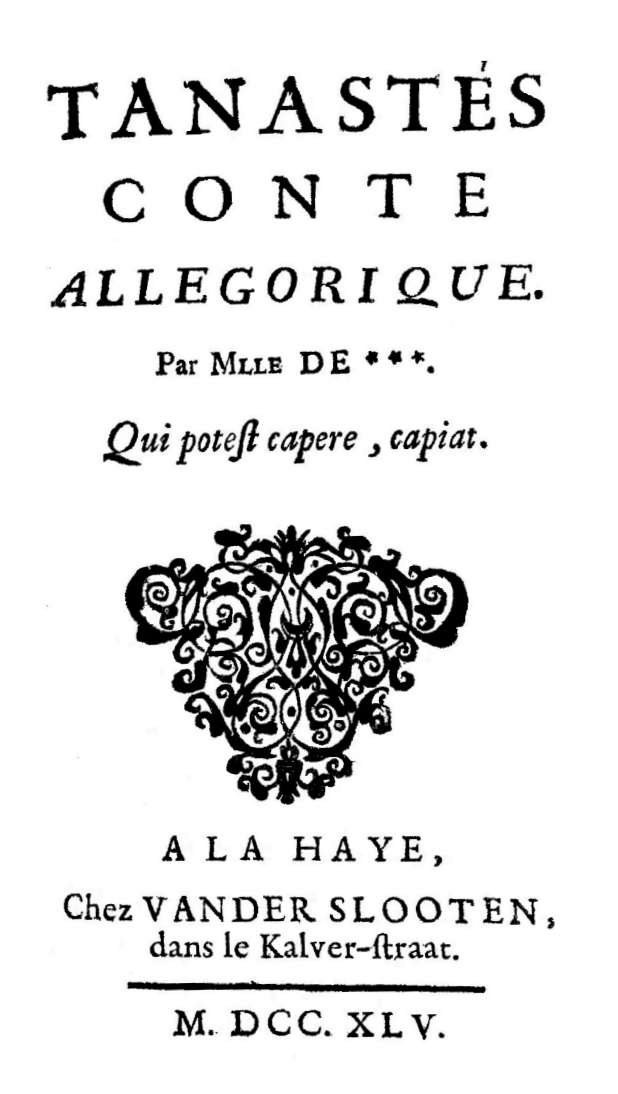
- title page of Tanastés (1745)
- Born: 20 October 1716; Versailles
- Died: 1770 (aged 53–54)
- Occupation: Novelist

Marie-Madeleine Bonafon (20 October 1716 – 1770), sometimes referred to as Marie-Madeleine Bonafous d'Albert, was a French novelist imprisoned for her novel Tanastés (1745), a roman à clef of the sex life of King Louis XV of France.

== Biography ==
Marie-Madeleine Bonafon was born on 20 October 1716 in Versailles, the daughter of Jean-Pierre de Bonafon, squire to Sieur d'Albert, and Marie Le Noir. Little is known of her early life except that she was educated at the Abbaye de Pentemont. In 1740, she moved to the Palace of Versailles to serve as femme de chambre to the Princesse de Montauban.

Her novel, Tanastés, is the allegorical fantasy story of the title character, a prince of the Zarimois, who takes a number of mistresses during his adventures. The character Tanastés was intended to represent King Louis, and the novel was sold with a key indicating the real life counterparts of the fictional characters. Tanastés was sold secretly but it spread widely enough that Louis' own daughter, Princess Adélaïde, owned a copy.

A police investigation into the novel resulted in the arrest of 21 booksellers, publishers, and others, including Bonafon herself in August 1745, who was interrogated by Claude Henri Feydeau de Marville, the lieutenant general of police. She insisted that Tanastés was just a fairy story and not intended to be about King Louis, despite the key.

Through a lettre de cachet, she was held in the Bastille for fourteen months, then confined to a convent incommunicado, at the Couvent des Bernardines de Moulins. In 1759, she was pardoned by the King, released, and granted a pension of 300 livres.

Bonafon published another novel, Confidences d'une jolie femme ("Secrets of a Pretty Woman", 1775). At the time of her arrest, Bonafon had written other works, including poetry, a partially written historical novel called Le Baron de *** and three plays: Le Destin, Les Dons, and Le Demi-Savant. The whereabouts of these manuscripts, if they survive, is unknown.
