= Marie-Madeleine Jodin =

French actor and author (1741–1790)

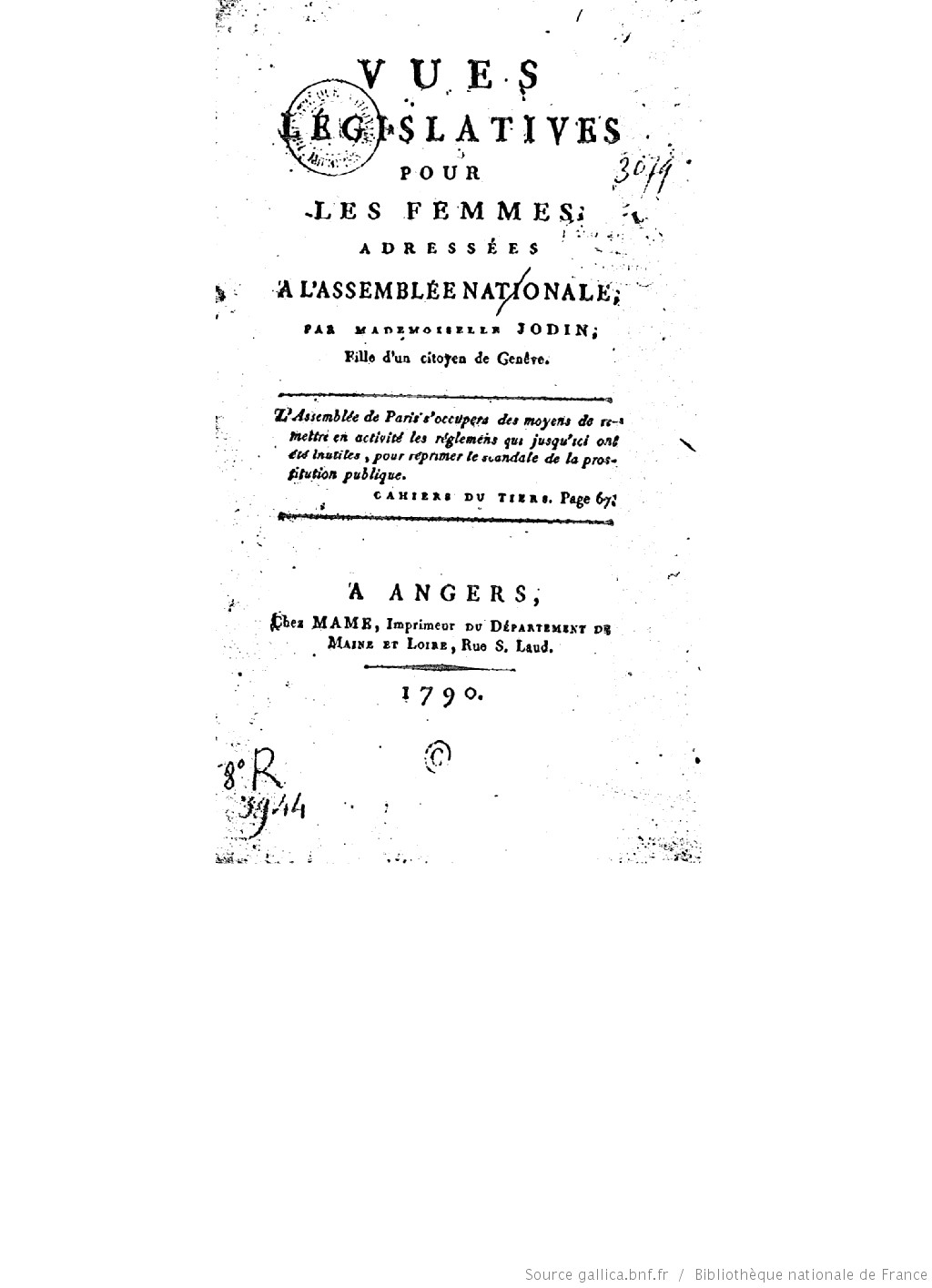
Cover of Jodin's treatise, Vues Législatives Pour Les Femmes.

Marie Madeleine Jodin (1741–1790) was an eighteenth-century French actress, friend of Diderot, and early feminist.

Jodin was born to a prostitute mother and a Swiss clockmaker father. After a childhood of forced imprisonment and religious conversion, she eventually became an actress performing in the Comedie Francaise in Paris and then in Warsaw, Dresden, and Bordeaux during the 1760s. When her father died she became the ward of his friend, the encyclopedist, and art critic Denis Diderot, who would become her mentor. Diderot's help would shape the course of her adult acting life and many of her feminist theories that she would later present in her treatise Vues Legislative Pour Les Femmes to the French National Assembly. Her treatise is considered to be the first feminist work to be written and signed by a woman in the French Revolutionary period and Enlightenment periods.

== Early life ==
Marie's father, Jean Jodin, married a former prostitute much older than himself. Due to the nature of his marriage his artisan family was wary of his new wife's ability to be a fit mother and suitable wife, Through letters that Jean Jodin wrote to his sister it is known that Marie Jodin was a troublesome child; her own father called her a “monster clothed in a human face”. At the age of nine she was forced to convert from Protestant to Catholic, a conversion that she fought throughout her childhood into her teenage years. As being Protestant in France was much more undesirable than being Catholic, it was advised that children convert in order to be treated better. Families like the Jodins were able to gain extra money by making children renounce the Protestant faith, or forcing a conversion. Throughout her life, Jodin was described as “quarrelsome and (having) often violent behavior”. Her violent behavior and her constant rejection of her Catholic conversion led to Jodin being sent to many convents throughout her childhood, as a way to fix her problems. Her behavior did not change while she was in the convents; she violently resisted the disciplines of convent life and of her conversion, and was expelled from six different convents. Her passage through these convents did however allow Jodin to become well educated, which in her adult years would allow her to write with intellectual and social confidence.

== Imprisonment ==
Jodin's family saw her as a lost cause, and pushed for her imprisonment. Familial rights were very strong during the 18th century throughout France, if a family wanted a young woman held against her own will, for their own good, the state could assist them in attempting to control their daughters and save their reputations. By the age of 16, after being expelled from numerous convents, Jodin along with her mother were working as prostitutes. Marie's family believes that her own mother forced her into prostitution at such a young age for her own financial gain. As a result, they were imprisoned for their actions for two years. This period of two years at which Jodin was imprisoned in Salpêtrière Hospital had a profound effect on her life, and her later political writings. Conditions were deplorable even for 18th century standards; girls lived in cramped overcrowded rooms and only received blankets during the cold winter months. Stories of prisoners being beaten for lack of productivity or disobedience were common. It was said by a member of an acting troupe, which Jodin would later belong to, that her shoulders showed visible signs of abuse and whippings that she received during her time at Salpêtrière.

== Diderot' influence ==
After her release from the hospital in 1760, Jodin was able to get back on her feet quickly largely in part to her late father's close friend, Denis Diderot. He arranged for her to go to the Comédie Française, which allowed her to become a licensed actress within a year of her being released. Diderot aimed to shape Jodin life through his personal theories on life as well as acting. As a mentor Diderot encouraged her to reform her life through rebuilding her character according to his dramatic and ethical theories. Diderot encouraged Jodin's intellectual ambitions that she had always had from a young age. Although Diderot was one of Jodin's closest friends and helped influence her life as well as her own theories on feminism, his name was never mentioned in her treatise, due to his conflicting views with Jean Jacques Rousseau.

== Acting career ==
Within a year of being released from her imprisonment Jodin was already a licensed actress, thanks to her friend Denis Diderot. Diderot was able to get her into the Comédie Française in Paris. Actresses, like prostitutes, could not enjoy the basic civil or religious rights of the average person. They were unable to marry, pass on property, or have their children legitimized. Many actresses died young or ended up living in poverty, or in worst cases would become prostitutes. These men and women were criticized for the qualities that made them successful. Theatre was a form of self-promoting and was seen as very flamboyant which was why those involved in theatre were considered morally suspect by many. Actresses were at best depicted as ladies of easy virtue, at worst as whores. As in her childhood, Jodin's years as an actress were tested by her short temper and erratic behavior. In 1766 when she was working in Warsaw there was an incident where she was arguing violently with her manager and another actor because a satirical pamphlet had come out about the French troupe that many thought Jodin had written. Following the release of the pamphlet an anonymous and vicious libel on Jodin's character came out. Jodin refused to act until she received an apology from whoever had slandered her; by doing this she risked imprisonment yet again (for breach of contract), but she refused to stand down.

In 1769 she was imprisoned while working in Bordeaux for mocking a religious procession. That same year while acting in Angers she again quarreled with her manager and this time was fired. She then successfully sued her manager for breach of contract. All of these quarrels that she had with her managers and her co-workers were attempts to assert her rights “and to gain some form of symbolic or legal reimbursement in the face of indiscriminate power”.

== Vues Législatives Pour Les Femmes ==
In 1790 she presented a treatise, entitled Vues Législatives Pour Les Femmes, or Legislative Views for Women, in front of the French National Assembly. Political works written by women in the 18th century were considered oddities; a letter, novel or a memoir was considered more suitable for female expression. But Marie Jodin was a radical for her time, who envisioned women in roles of political power, not the ones being told what to do. It wasn't until the eve of the revolution that women like Jodin were able to write on political topics, such as the rights of women. As daughter of a citizen of Geneva, Jodin believed she had inherited an honorable and superior social status that gave her confidence to defend her rights as a woman and as a citizen of France.

Throughout her treatise she constantly evoked Jean-Jacques Rousseau, who, in his own work, celebrated the citizens of Geneva. This enabled her to draft a model of citizenship which he had originally designed for men, and to apply it to women. Her 86-page treatise defended and argued for women in France on numerous different levels. Her primary demand was for the establishment of a women's legislature with jurisdiction over women's issues such as the institution of divorce. She believed that women should be in the realm of public life in order to legislate on behalf of women. She was interested in changing the political situation for women in France and since women were becoming more involved in public activities, due to the Enlightenment, she emphasized that “the love of country, the love of liberty and glory animates our sex as much as yours, messieurs. We are not another species on earth”. She argued that men and women were equal, and that there should be a single standard for both sexes. She also proposed the eradication of prostitution; she attacked public prostitution and more specifically the wider idea of moral corruption. Inspired by her own time spent imprisoned due to prostitution, she argued for the suppression of prostitution, but did not want prostitutes to be imprisoned. She sought to transform them by allowing them to become useful and productive citizens, rather than locking them up and allowing for the vicious cycle of prostitution and poverty to continue. In the same year that she presented her treatise, Jodin died. Two years after her death the Law of 20 September 1792 passed. This law legalized divorce, and was the most liberal law on divorce in Europe. Marie Jodin's treatise allowed for the understanding of social and gender composition of the time and demonstrated that a feminist agenda was already securely in place during the early days of the French Revolution.

== Bibliography ==
Gordon, Felicia (2001) ‘This Accursed Child’: The Early Years of Marie Madeleine Jodin (1741–90) Actress, Philosophe and Feminist, Women's History Review, 10:2, 229-248
Simonton, Deborah. The Routledge History of Women in Europe since 1700. London: Routledge, 2006.
Gordon, Felicia, P. N. Furbank, and Marie-Madeleine Jodin. Marie Madeleine Jodin, 1741-1790: Actress, Philosophe, and Feminist. Aldershot: Ashgate, 2001.
Curtis-Wendlandt, Lisa, Paul Richard, Gibbard, and Karen Green. Political Ideas of Enlightenment Women. Ashgate Publishing Group, 2013.
Cameron, Vivian P.. 1984. “Two 18th-century French Art Critics”. Woman's Art Journal 5 (1). Old City Publishing, Inc.: 8–11. doi:10.2307/1357878
