= Marie Madeleine Kamano =

Guinean politician

Deputy in the National Assembly (Guinea)
- President: Alpha Conde
- Preceded by: Elisabeth Oularé
- Constituency: Kissidougou

Personal details
- Party: Rally of the Guinean People
- Committees: Committee for Environnement, Fisheries, Rural Sustainable Development

Marie Madeleine Kamano is a Guinean politician who represents the constituency of Kissidougou, in the National Assembly (Guinea). She is a member of the Majority Rally of the Guinean People Party of former president Alpha Conde.
