= Mary Magdalene (Scorel) =

Painting by Jan van Scorel

Maria Magdalene
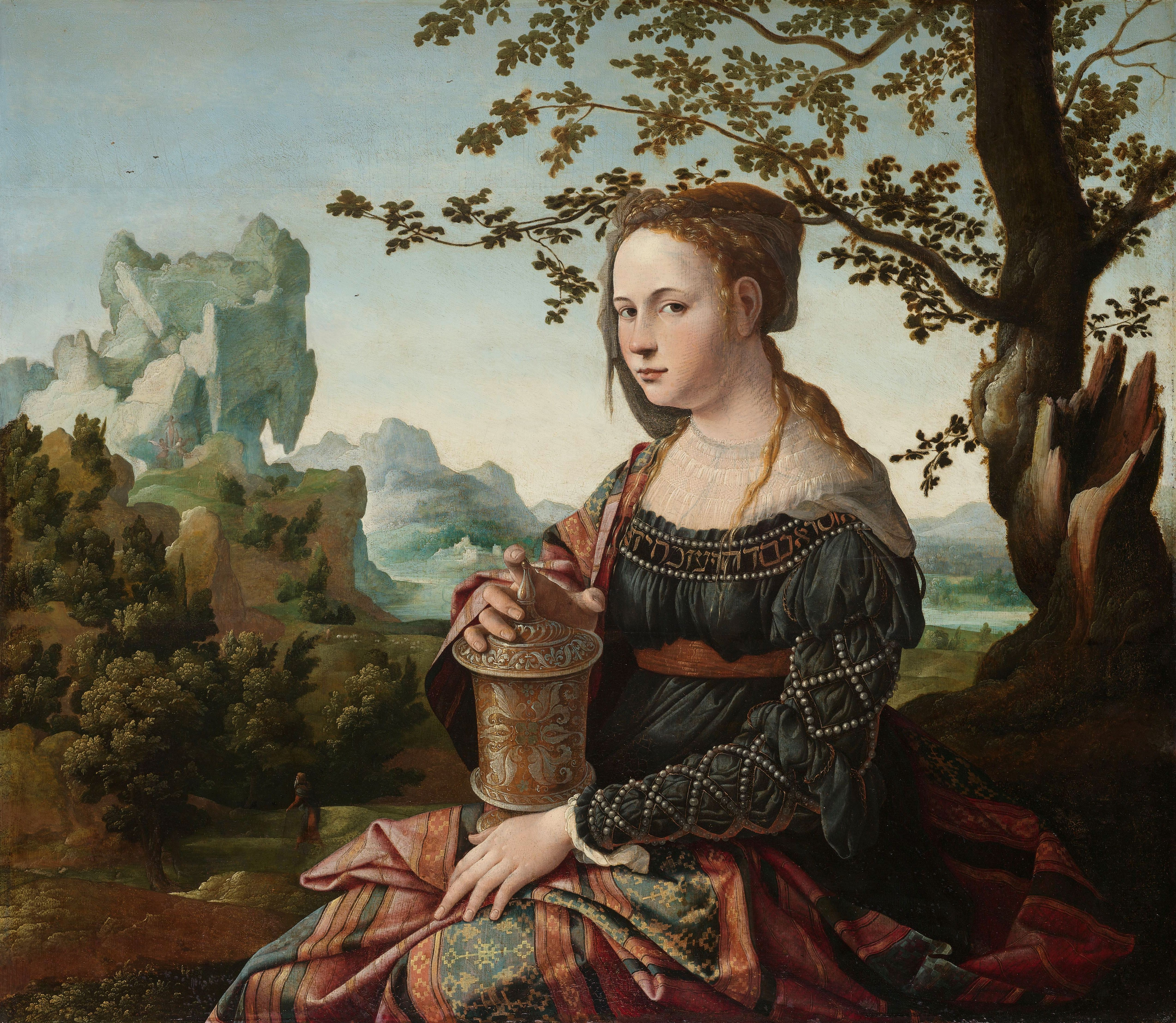
- Artist: Jan van Scorel
- Year: circa 1530
- Medium: Oil on panel
- Dimensions: 67 cm × 76.5 cm (26 in × 30.1 in)
- Location: Rijksmuseum, Amsterdam

Maria Magdalene is a circa 1530 oil on panel painting by the Dutch renaissance artist Jan van Scorel in the collection of the Rijksmuseum.

== Painting ==
Mary Magdalene is shown seated, holding a richly decorated pot of ointment in a fantasy landscape. Her bodice is embroidered with Hebrew lettering and her shawl shows the same pattern of Haarlem damast material that can be seen in Saint Luke painting the Virgin by Maarten van Heemskerck.

== Provenance ==
This painting was in the collection of the Commanderij van Sint Jan in Haarlem and was appropriated in 1572 (as a work by Van Scorel) after the Beeldenstorm for the Haarlem City Hall. It was again appropriated by the national collection in 1804 (as an anonymous work) and has remained in the national collection on show in Amsterdam ever since, though it was on loan to the Frans Hals Museum for many years during the renovation of the Rijksmuseum.

== Exhibitions ==
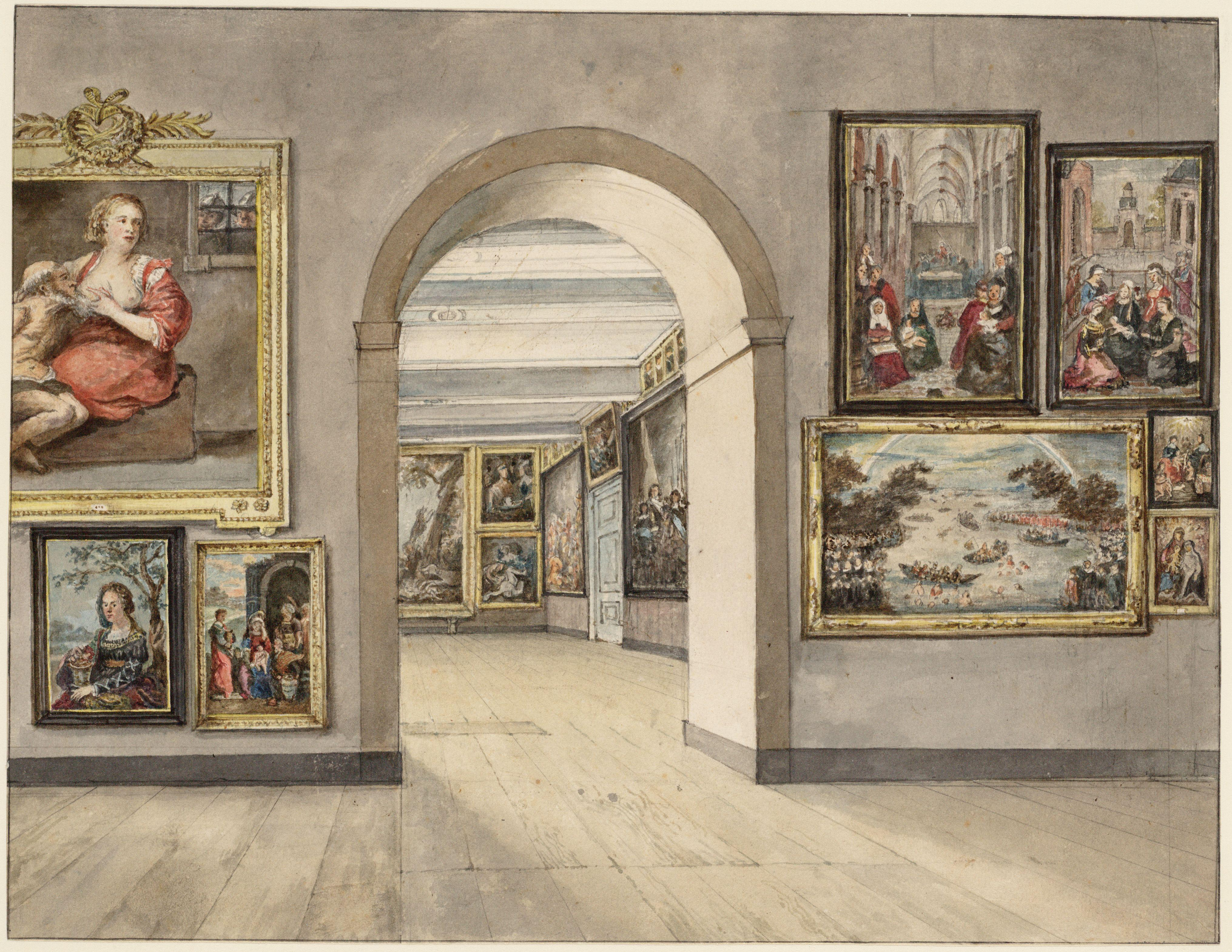
This painting can be seen hanging in a 19th-century sketch of the gallery of the Trippenhuis before the collection was moved to its present location in 1885

This painting has been considered a highlight of the collection since it was acquired in 1804 and has been included in all Highlights of the Rijksmuseum catalogs.
