= Marie-Madeleine Frémy =

French artist (died 1788)

Marie-Madeleine Frémy (died 1788) was a French painter.

Daughter of François-Nicolas Frémy (1727–1789), seigneur de La Marque, and his wife Madeleine Charlot (1734–1800), her mother was a cousin of Adélaïde Labille-Guiard, with whom she studied. Her parents were married in Troyes in 1758; her date of birth is unknown, but it is presumed that as second daughter she was likely born in Aube in the early 1760s. In 1783 she exhibited a pastel and a number of portrait miniatures in Paris, among which was a portrait of her fellow pupil Marie-Victoire Davril.
