= Pala della Peste =

Painting by Guido Reni

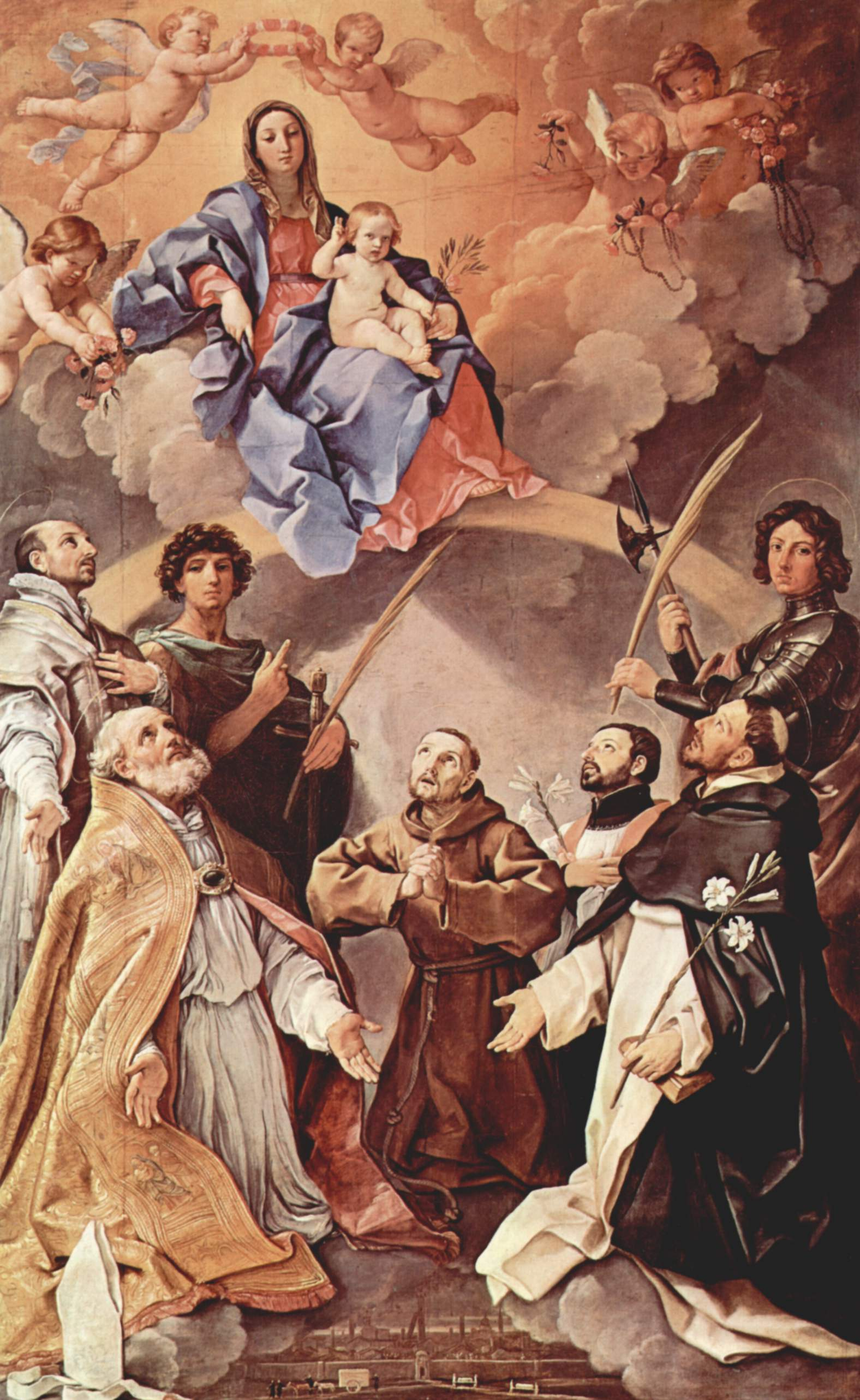
Pala della Peste (1631–1632) by Guido Reni

The Pala della Peste (Altarpiece of the Bubonic Plague) or Pallione del Voto is an oil on silk Baroque-style altarpiece by Guido Reni depicts the Madonna and Child in Glory with the Patron Saints of Bologna: Petronius, Francis, Ignatius, Francis Xavier, Proculus of Bologna, and Florian.

== Description ==
The altarpiece was painted in 1631–1632 as an ex voto after the ebbing of the plague epidemic in 1630 in Bologna. The altarpiece was in the past paraded yearly in a formal procession from the Palazzo Pubblico to the church of San Domenico, Bologna.

The structure of the painting follows the formal arrangement, exemplified by a late 16th-century canvas by Annibale Carraci in the Pinacoteca of Bologna. The Madonna and child are in the superior portion. The infant blesses with his right hand, while the left hand holds a flowering sprig. Around the couple, cherubim are active draping flowers, holding rosaries and scapulars, and crowning the Virgin with a crown of stars. The virgin is depicted with many of the attributes of the Virgin of the Immaculate Conception, though instead of an upward concave crescent moon, she stands on an inverted rainbow, sign of the peace the waning of the plague brings.

In the scene below, the seven saints implore for Bologna, depicted at the bottom center. Charles Borromeo, recently canonized, at the far left was known for his work among the pestilent of Milan. Beside him standing is St Proculus of Bologna, a martyred Roman soldier, holding a sword and palm leaf (symbol of martyrdom). Kneeling below Proculus is: St Petronius with a bishop's mitre at his feet. Across the canvas, the armored St Florian holds a halberd and palm leaf. St Francis in a cassock, and to the right are two Jesuit saints, Francis Xavier with the palm leaf pointing to him, and the founder of the order St Ignatius of Loyola. St Dominic kneels on the right holding the lily of purity. Finally down below under an ominous grey sky is the city of Bologna with its towers. Outside the city wall are undertakers ferrying bodies for burial, while individuals at the wall clamor or lament.

The style recalls the earthy coloring of Ludovico Carracci. The work is now in the Pinacoteca of Bologna, which also has a 1616 ex voto Madonna by Reni. The Pala della Peste is described by Viardot as "an excellent specimen of the pale coloring which Guido had adopted".

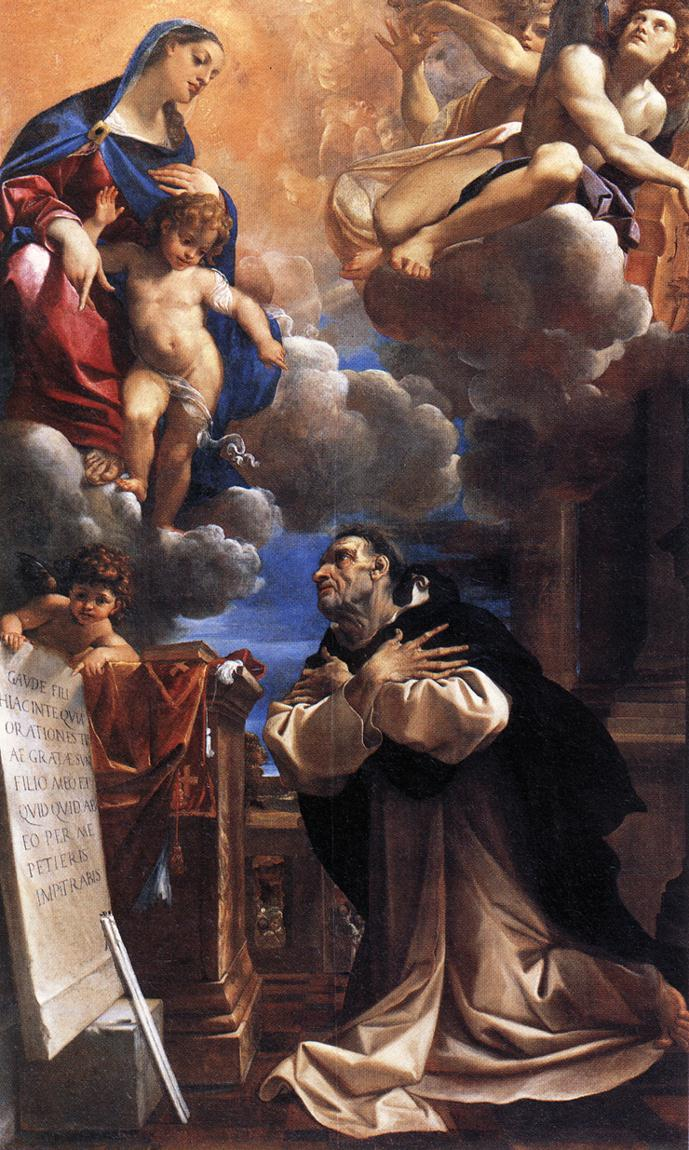
Madonna and Child in Glory with St Hyacinth, 1598 by Ludovico Carracci, originally in San Domenico, Bologna, and now at the Louvre, Paris

== External sources ==
- See Mutual Art for an in-depth discussion on this painting by Catherine R. Puglisi / The Art Bulletin (1995).
