= Marie Madeleine Togo =

Malian politician

Marie Madeleine Togo is a Malian politician. She serves as the Malian Minister of Health and Public Hygiene.
