= Marija Magdalena =

Marija Magdalena (Mary Magdalene in Croatian) may refer to:

- Marija Magdalena (song)
- Marija Magdalena, Croatia, a village in Pušća, Zagreb County

== See also ==
- Sveta Marija Magdalena, a village near Tribanj, Zadar County, Croatia
