= Maria Maddalena de' Pazzi =

Maria Maddalena de' Pazzi may refer to:

- Mary Magdalene de' Pazzi, Italian Carmelite mystic and saint of the Roman Catholic Church
- Santa Maria Maddalena dei Pazzi, a church in Florence
- Santa Maria Magdalena de Pazzis Cemetery, a cemetery in San Juan, Puerto Rico
