= Madonna in Glory with Saints =

Painting by Pietro Perugino

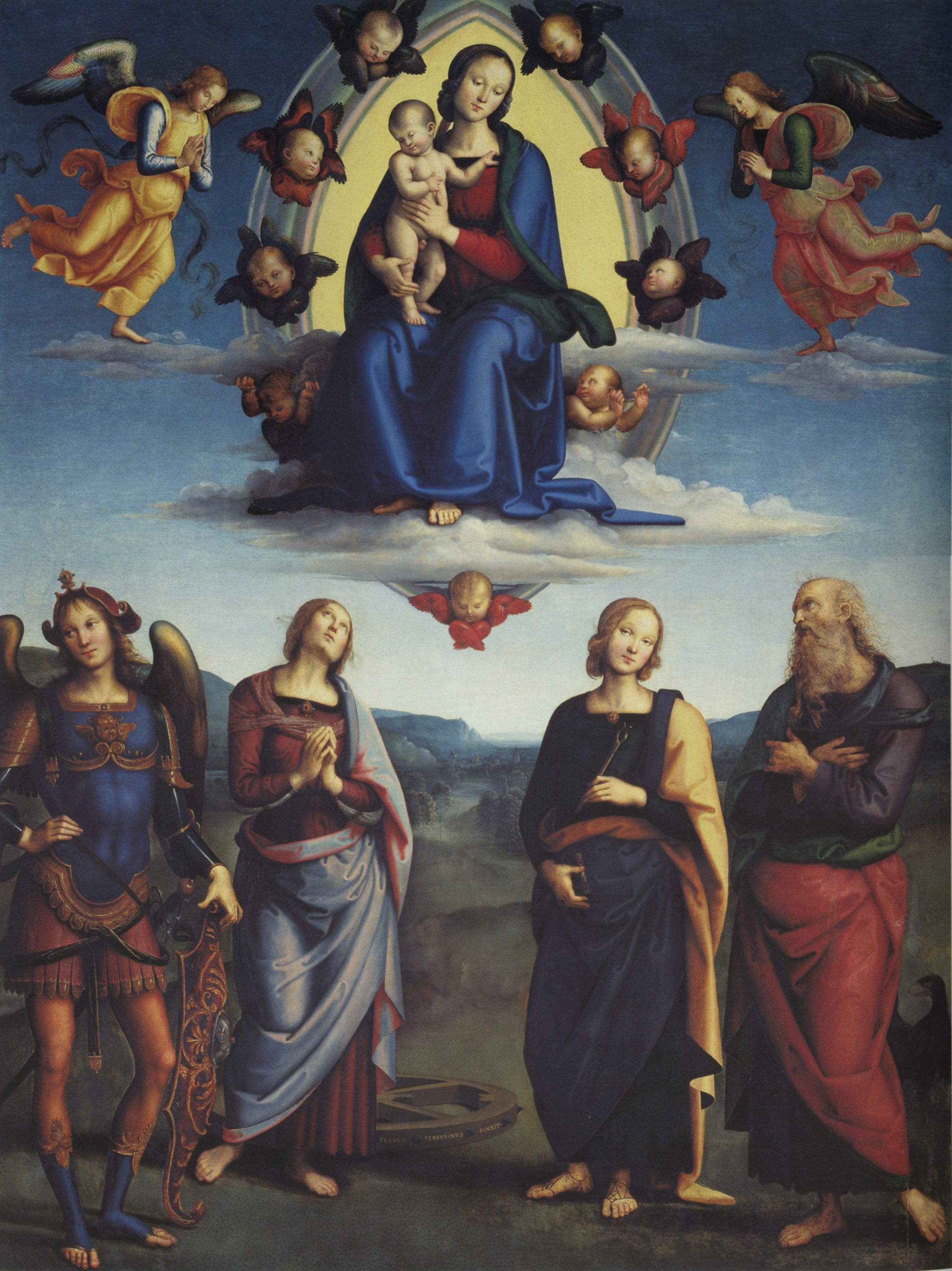
- Artist: Pietro Perugino
- Year: c. 1500–1501
- Medium: Oil on panel
- Dimensions: 330 cm × 265 cm (130 in × 104 in)
- Location: Pinacoteca Nazionale di Bologna

The Madonna in Glory with Saints is a painting by the Italian Renaissance painter Pietro Perugino, dating to c. 1500–1501. It is housed in the Pinacoteca Nazionale of Bologna, Italy.

It was originally located in the Scarani Chapel of the church of San Giovanni in Monte.

== Description ==
The scheme of the composition, typical of Perugino's mature works (based on the lost Assumption of the Sistine Chapel and used in numerous works of the period, such as the San Francesco al Prato Resurrection and the Vallombrosa Altarpiece), includes two different levels. The Madonna with Child, depicted within an almond in the upper part; and a group of four saints above a hilly landscape in the lower one.

The saints are, from the left: the Archangel Michael (with a decorated armor), Catherine of Alexandria (with her traditional attributed of the torture wheel), Apollonia (with the pincer of her martyrdom) and John the Evangelist, who has the Tetramorph eagle).

Perugino's signature (PETRUS PERUSINUS PINXIT) can be seen on Catherine's wheel.

== Sources ==
- Garibaldi, Vittoria (2004). "Perugino". Pittori del Rinascimento. Florence: Scala. ISBN 888117099X.
