= San Francesco al Prato Resurrection =

Painting by Pietro Perugino

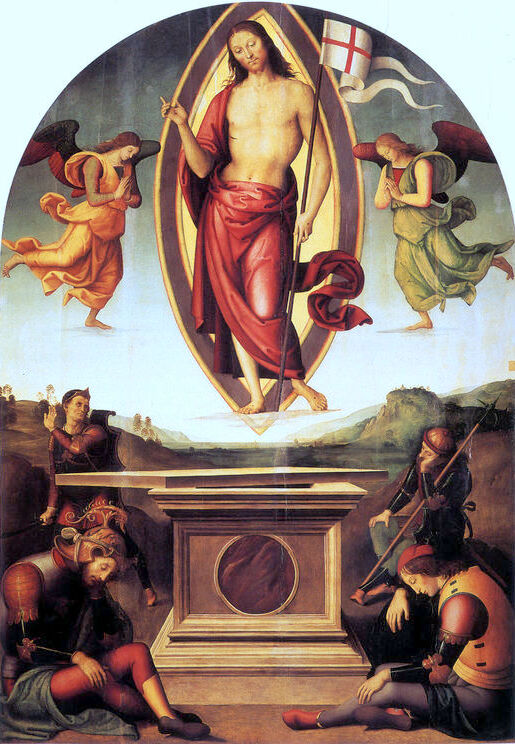
- Artist: Pietro Perugino
- Year: c. 1499
- Medium: Oil on panel
- Dimensions: 233 cm × 165 cm (92 in × 65 in)
- Location: Pinacoteca Vaticana, Rome

The San Francesco al Prato Resurrection is a painting by the Italian Renaissance painter Pietro Perugino, dating to c. 1499. It is housed in the Pinacoteca Vaticana, Rome.

== History ==
The work takes its name from the church of San Francesco al Prato of Perugia, where it was originally located. It was commissioned in 1499 and finished presumably around 1501. During the artworks spoliations following the French Napoleonic invasion of Italy, it was brought to Paris. It returned to Italy in 1815, and thenceforth it has been exhibited at the Vatican Museums' art gallery.

According to art historian Giovanni Battista Cavalcaselle, Raphael, then an assistant of Perugino, had a major role in the execution of the Resurrection. This opinion is however generally rejected by most other art historians.

== Description ==
The work follows a typical scheme of Perugino's art. The divinity, in this case the resurrected Jesus, is depicted within a mandorla occupying the upper part of the painting, among angels. The lower part shows, above a landscape in the background, the open sarcophagus and several Roman soldiers, three of whom are sleeping and one awakened by the miracle. Another example of the scheme is the contemporary Transfiguration in the Collegio del Cambio in Perugia.

The figure of Christ, holding the flag symbolic of the resurrection, has the typical harmony and softness of Perugino's mature works, with a detailed chest and a bright drapery with deep pleats. The two angels at his sides are symmetrical, and were obtained from the same cartoon (used by the artist and his workshop also in other works, such as the Madonna in Glory with Saints at Bologna).

The sarcophagus has its cover correctly painted according to geometrical perspective. The soldiers are also painted with attentions and details, such as the fanciful crest of the helmet, also present in the Collegio del Cambio frescoes.

== Sources ==
- Garibaldi, Vittoria (2004). Perugino. (Pittori del Rinascimento.) Florence: Scala. ISBN 888117099X
