= Chiara Fancelli =

Prominent figure in Florentine history

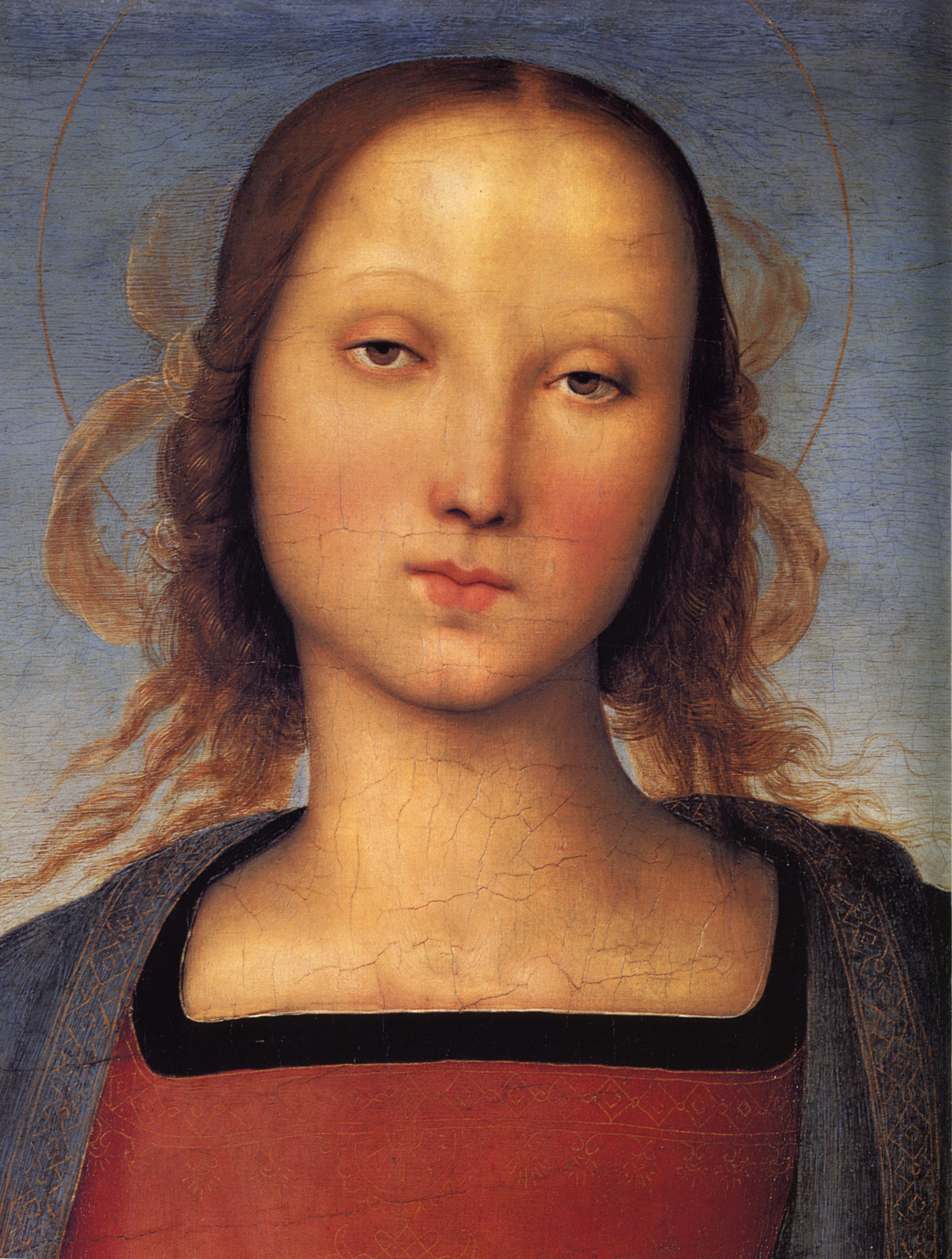

Chiara Fancelli (died 21 May 1541) was a figure in Florentine history, best known as the daughter of the architect Luca Fancelli and the wife and model of Pietro Perugino.

Her precise birth date and birthplace are unknown. She married Perugino on 1 September 1493, bringing a dowry of five hundred gold florins. She had three sons and two daughters with him and was the model for his Madonnas from 1494 onwards. On 6 October 1524, after her husband's death, she wrote to Isabella d'Este to offer her his Mars and Venus Surprised by Vulcan for her studiolo, but d'Este refused it. She was buried in the cloister of the dead at Santissima Annunziata, Florence.
