= Maddy =

Maddy may refer to:

== People ==
- Maddy (given name) (also a common nickname and diminutive), alternatively spelled Maddie
- diminutive of Madeleine (name)
- diminutive of Madison (name)
- diminutive of Maddison
- Maddy (surname)
- R. Maddy, nickname of R. Madhavan (born 1970), Indian film actor
  - Maddy, character portrayed by him in the 2001 Indian film Rehnaa Hai Terre Dil Mein

== Places ==
- Loch Maddy, North Uist, Outer Hebrides, Scotland, UK; a sea loch; see List of bays of the Outer Hebrides#Loch Maddy

== Other uses ==
- Maddyness, an online newspaper
- HMS Loch Maddy (K630), an unbuilt WWII Loch-class frigate
- SS Loch Maddy (sunk 1940), see List of shipwrecks in February 1940
- SS Empire Trail (launched 1943), named "Loch Maddy" 1951–1960; see List of Empire ships (Th–Ty)#Empire Trail

== See also ==
- Maidie Norman (1912–1998), African-American actress
- Madi (disambiguation)
- Madhi (disambiguation)
- Mahdi (disambiguation)
- Maddi (disambiguation)
- Madie (disambiguation)
- Mady
- Madison (disambiguation)
- Madeleine (disambiguation)
