= Madeleine (given name) =

Name list

Madeleine, Madeline
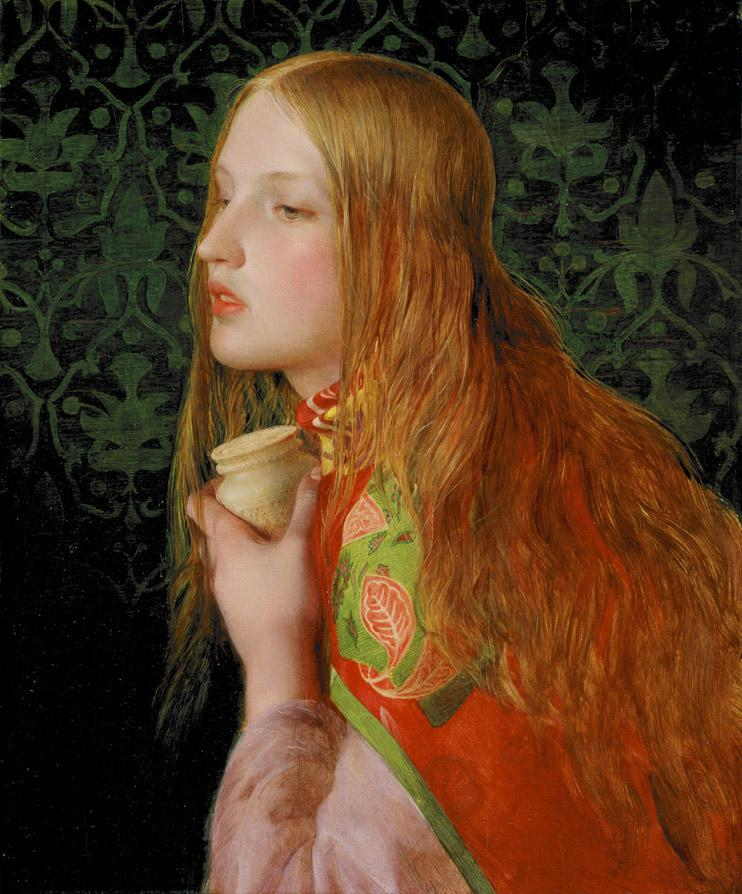
- Mary Magdalene, the saint responsible for the popularity of the name Madeline, in a painting by Frederick Sandys
- Pronunciation: /ˈmædəlɪn/ MAD-əl-in, /ˈmædlɪn/ MAD-lin /ˈmædəlaɪn/ MAD-əl-line /ˈmædəliːn/ MAD-əl-leen /ˈmædəleɪn/ MAD-əl-ayn (rare or archaic) French: [madlɛn] MAD-len
- Gender: Female

Origin
- Origin: Greek, Latin, Germanic
- Meaning: 'from the city of Magdala'; alteration of 'Madalinde'

Other names
- Nicknames: Maddy, Maddie, Madi, Lena, Leni
- Related names: Maddalena, Madelyn/Madalyn, Magda, Magdalena, Magdalene, Madalinde
- Popularity: see popular names

Madeleine or Madeline has both biblical and Germanic origins. In the biblical tradition, the name is derived from Magdalena, referring to Mary Magdalene and ultimately to the Aramaic term "Magdala” meaning "tower" or "elevated, great.” Magdala was a town on the Sea of Galilee traditionally identified as the hometown of Mary Magdalene, a prominent figure in the New Testament and a follower of Jesus.

The name was adopted from Aramaic into Greek as Μαγδαληνή (Magdalēnē) and later into Latin as Magdalena. In Latin, it became more commonly used as a personal name, largely due to the association with Mary Magdalene, a revered saint in Christian tradition.

Volker Kohlheim suggests that medieval names were often Latinized and adapted as they passed between languages, and Madeleine (or Madeline) absorbed the Germanic name Madalinde , which comes from mahal (“council, assembly”) and linþaz (“gentle, soft, mild”), giving a meaning of “gentle speaker in council.”

The name Madeleine is typically pronounced mah-DLEHN in French. In English it has several pronunciations: MAHD-uh-lihn or MAHD-uh-lein are the most common, with MAHD-uh-leen and MAHD-uh-lain (a much older version influenced by the French) heard occasionally. Pronunciations can vary based on region and preference.

Madelyn and Madalyn are alternative spellings. Diminutives include Maddy, Maddie, Madi, Mado, and Lena, Leni.

== People named Madeleine ==
- Madeleine of Valois (1520–1537), French princess who was briefly Queen consort of Scotland through her marriage to James V of Scotland
- Madeleine Albright (1937–2022), American politician and the first woman United States Secretary of State
- Madeleine Astor (1893–1940), American socialite, second wife and widow of millionaire John Jacob Astor IV and a survivor of the RMS Titanic disaster
- Madeleine Atlas (born 1968), Swedish politician
- Madeleine Sophie Barat (1779–1865), French Catholic saint and founder of the Society of the Sacred Heart
- Madelaine Bavent (1602–1652), French nun accused and convicted of witchcraft
- Madeleine Béjart (1618–1672), French actress and theatre director
- Madeleine Brès (1842–1921), first French woman to obtain a medical degree
- Madeleine Boll (born 1953), Swiss footballer
- Madeleine Boullogne (1646–1710), French Baroque still life painter
- Madeleine Duncan Brown (1925–2002), alleged mistress of president Lyndon B. Johnson
- Madeleine Carroll (1906–1987), English actress
- Madeleine Chenette, Canadian politician
- Madeleine Cho, Korean saint
- Madeleine Damerment (1917–1944), French Resistance member
- Madeleine Dassault (1901–1992), French industrialist
- Madeleine Dean (born 1959), American politician
- Madeleine Herman de Blic, Belgian-born Indian social worker and humanist
- Madeleine de Roybon d'Allonne (1646–1718), early settler of New France
- Madeleine Eastoe, Australian ballet dancer
- Madeleine Eggendorffer, Swiss bookseller, publisher and businesswoman
- Madeleine Harris (born 2001), English actress
- Madeleine Juneau (1945–2020), Canadian museologist, teacher, nun
- Madeleine Kunin (born 1933), American politician and first woman governor of Vermont
- Madeleine Lartessuti (1478–1543), French shipper and banker
- Madeleine L'Engle (1918–2007), American writer; author of the Wrinkle in Time series
- Madeleine Linke (born 1992), German politician
- Madeleine Lipszyc (known as Magdalith, 1932–2013), French painter, singer, composer, author and liturgist
- Madeleine Martin (born 1993), American actress
- Madeleine Marzin (1908–1998), French trade unionist, communist activist, and deputy to the National Assembly
- Madeleine Mantock (born 1990), British actress
- Madeleine McCann (born 2003), British girl who disappeared while on vacation in Portugal in May 2007
- Madeleine Mitchell, British violinist
- Madeleine Molinier (1898–1976), French scientist and nurse who worked with Marie Curie at the Radium Institute in Paris
- Madeleine Pelling (born c. 1990s), English cultural and art historian
- Madeleine Peyroux (born 1973), American jazz singer, songwriter, and guitarist
- Madeleine de Puisieux (1720–1798), French philosopher and feminist writer
- Madeleine Rolland (1872–1960), French translator and peace activist
- Madeleine Smith (1835–1928), Scottish woman tried for murder
- Madeleine Stowe (born 1958), American actress
- Madeleine Tchicaya (1930–2021), Ivorian politician
- Madeleine Vionnet (1876–1975), French fashion designer who was the first to cut dresses on the bias
- Madeleine Worrall (born 1977), Scottish actress
- Princess Madeleine, Duchess of Hälsingland and Gästrikland (born 1982), ninth in line to the Swedish throne

== People named Madeline ==
- Madeline Argy (born 2000), English influencer
- Madeline Bell (born 1942), American soul singer
- Madeline McDowell Breckinridge (1872–1920), American women's suffragette leader and reformer
- Madeline Brewer (born 1992), American actress
- Madeline Carroll (born 1996), American actress
- Madeline Duggan (born 1994), English actress
- Madeline Early (1912–2001), American mathematician and university professor
- Madeline Fairbanks (1900–1989), American actress
- Madeline Gravante (born 1999), American soccer player
- Madeline Ivalu, Canadian filmmaker and actress
- Madeline Juno (born 1995), German singer-songwriter
- Madeline Kahn (1942–1999), American actress, comedian and singer
- Madeline Kripke (1943–2020), American book collector
- Madeline Lewellin (1854–1944), Australian artist
- Madeline Manning (born 1948), American track and field runner
- Madeline Martin, American author
- Madeline Mitchell (born 1989), American beauty pageant contestant
- Madeline Munro (1885–1974), British geologist, science educator and film reviewer
- Madeline Perry (born 1977), professional squash player from Northern Ireland
- Madeline Schizas (born 2003), Canadian figure skater
- Madeline Sharafian (born 1993), American-Armenian film director, screenwriter, and storyboard artist
- Madeline Smith (born 1949), English actress and comedian
- Madeline Stratton Morris (1906–2007), American educator
- Madeline Woo (born 1998), American ballet dancer
- Madeline Zima (born 1985), American actress

== Fictional characters ==
- Madeline, heroine of the book series of the same name by Ludwig Bemelmans
- Madeline (Celeste), protagonist of the 2018 video game Celeste
- Madeline Bassett, a recurring character in the Jeeves stories of P. G. Wodehouse
- Maddy Ferguson, in the television series Twin Peaks
- Maddie Fitzpatrick (Madeline), in Disney's TV series The Suite Life of Zack & Cody
- Madelyne Pryor, from X-Men.
- Madeline Westen, in the television series Burn Notice
