= Maddi (disambiguation) =

Maddi is a town and union council of Kulachi Tehsil, Dera Ismail Khan, Khyber-Pakhtunkhwa, Pakistan.

Maddi may also refer to:

== People ==
=== Given name ===
- Diminutive of Madison
- Diminutive of Maddison
- Diminutive of Madeleine
- Maddi Gay (born 1996), Australian rules-football player
- Maddi Madd (born Marlon Grimes), U.S. rapper
- Maddi Sudarsanam (1906–1994), Indian politician
- Maddi Torre (born 1996), Spanish soccer player
- Maddi Wesche (born 1999), New Zealander shotputter
- Maddi Wheeler (born 2002), Canadian ice hockey player

=== Surname ===
- Chauki Maddi (1929–2018), Brazilian singer

== See also ==
- Corrado Maddii (born 1957), Italian motocross racer
- Madi (disambiguation)
- Madhi (disambiguation)
- Mahdi (disambiguation)
- Maddy (disambiguation) including Maddie
- Mady
- Madie (disambiguation)
- Madison (disambiguation)
- Madeleine (disambiguation)
