= Madie =

Madie may refer to:

== Places ==
- Madie, Tennessee, USA

== People ==
- a diminutive of the name Madison (name)
- a diminutive of the name Maddison
- a diminutive of the name Madeleine

Given named

- Madie Carroll, namesake of the Madie Carroll House
- Madie Ives, namesake of the Madie Ives Elementary School
- Madie Hall Xuma (1894–1982), U.S. African American educator and South African activist

== See also ==
- Madi (disambiguation)
- Madhi (disambiguation)
- Mahdi (disambiguation)
- Maddi (disambiguation)
- Maddy (disambiguation) including Maddie
- Mady
- Madison (disambiguation)
- Madeleine (disambiguation)
