= Madhi (disambiguation) =

Madhi may refer to:

== Places ==
- Madhi, Pathardi, Ahmednagar, Maharashtra, India
- Madhi railway station, Madhi, Tapi, Gujarat, India

== People ==
- Mamta Madhi (born 1971), Indian politician
- Mohammad Reza Madhi (died 2021), Iranian spy
- R. Madhi (born 1971), Indian cinematographer
- Shabir Madhi (born 1966), South African professor of vaccinology

== Other uses ==
- Madhi (2022 film), an Indian film

== See also ==
- Madhi Madhi language
- Madhi Madhi people, another term for Mathi Mathi people
- Madi (disambiguation)
- Mahdi (disambiguation)
- Maddi (disambiguation)
- Maddy (disambiguation) including Maddie
- Mady
- Madie (disambiguation)
