= Madi =

Madi may refer to:

== Places ==
- Madi, Chitwan, a municipality in Chitwan District in Nepal
- Madi Municipality, Sankhuwasabha, a municipality in Sankhuwasabha District in Nepal
- Madi Rural Municipality, Rolpa, a rural municipality in Rolpa District in Nepal
- Madi Rural Municipality, Kaski, a rural municipality in Kaski District in Nepal
- Madi, Estonia, a village in Estonia
- Madi Khola, a tributary of the West Rapti River, Nepal
- Madi River, a tributary of the Gandaki River, Nepal
- Madi (canal), old canals in Isfahan, diverted from the Zayande River
- Medinet Madi, an archaeological site in Faiyum, Egypt

== People and characters ==
- Madi people of South Sudan and Uganda
- Madi, the central character in Gardening for Kids with Madi
- Madison "Madi" Bader, a Season 2 contestant in Fetch! with Ruff Ruffman
- Madi Williams (born 1999), American basketball player

== Other uses ==
- MADI, a digital audio interface
- Madí, an international abstract art movement, begun in Argentina ("Movimiento Abstracción Dimensión Invención")
- Madi language (disambiguation)
- Moscow Automobile and Road Construction State Technical University, shortened as MADI, a technical university in Moscow

== See also ==
- Mahdi (disambiguation)
- Madhi (disambiguation)
- Maddi (disambiguation)
- Maddy (disambiguation) including Maddie
- Mady
- Madie (disambiguation)
