= Madi Rural Municipality =

Madi Rural Municipality may refer to:

- Madi Rural Municipality, Kaski, a rural municipality in Nepal
- Madi Rural Municipality, Rolpa, a rural municipality in Nepal

== See also ==
- Madi (disambiguation)
