= Leni =

Leni may refer to:

- Leni (name)
- Leni, Sicily
