= Maddy (given name) =

Maddy or Maddie is a shortened form of the feminine given names Madeleine, Madeline, Madelyn, Madison, etc.

== People ==
=== Maddy ===
- Maddy Christian (born 2004), American ice hockey player
- Maddy Crippen (born 1980), American medley swimmer
- Maddy Cusack (1995–2023), English footballer
- Maddy English (1925–2004), American professional baseball player
- Maddy Evans (born 1991), American soccer player
- Maddy Hill (born 1990), English actress
- Maddy Morphosis (born 1994), American drag performer
- Maddy Prior (born 1947), English folk singer
- Maddy Scott (born 1991), Canadian person who had been missing since 2011 and whose remains were found in 2023
- Maddy Rosenberg (born 1956), American artist and curator
- Maddy Samoskevich (born 2002), American ice hockey player
- Maddy Siegrist (born 2000), American basketball player
- Maddy Thorson (born 1988), Canadian video game developer
- Maddy Westbeld (born 2002), American basketball player
- R. Maddy, nickname of R. Madhavan (born 1970), Indian film actor

=== Maddie ===
- Maddie Grace Jepson (born 1999), English media personality
- Maddie Madayag (born 1998), Filipina volleyball player
- Maddie Moate (born 1988), English TV presenter and YouTube filmmaker
- Maddie Poppe (born 1997), American singer-songwriter, 16th winner of American Idol (2018)
- Maddie Rooney (born 1997), American ice hockey player
- Maddie Ziegler (born 2002), American dancer

== Fictional characters ==
- Madalyn "Maddie" Bishop, main character of the 2018 show Siren
- Madeline "Maddie" Kendall-Buckley, a 9-1-1 dispatcher on American television series 9-1-1
- Maddie Fenton, on the Nickelodeon show Danny Phantom
- Maddy Ferguson, on the U.S. television series Twin Peaks
- Maddie Fitzpatrick, from the Disney television series The Suite Life of Zack and Cody
- Maddie Flour, from the Disney Channel animated series Amphibia
- Maddie Hayes, on the U.S. television series Moonlighting, role played by Cybill Shepherd
- Maddie Heath, on the UK television show Coronation Street
- Maddie Magellan, a lead character in the UK television show Jonathan Creek
- Maddy Osborne, on the Australian soap opera Home and Away
- Maddie Wachowski, a character from Sonic The Hedgehog Films Series played by Tika Sumpter
- Maddy Perez, a main character of the US HBO television show Euphoria
- Maddie Rooney, from the Disney Channel program Liv and Maddie, played by Dove Cameron
- Maddy Young, from the BBC medical drama Holby City
- Maddie, inland taipan protagonist of Back to the Outback
- Madi Griffin, Clarke's adopted daughter on the US CW television show, The 100

== See also ==
- Madlyn (given name)
