= Jagman Gurung =

Historian about Nepalese culture

Jagman Gurung (जगमान गुरुङ) is a historian, author and lecturer on Nepali culture. He was born in Yangjakot of Madi Rural Municipality, Kaski in Nepal. He is recipient of various national awards for his works related to culture and history of Nepal including Nepal Rishi Award and Rastriya Prathiva Puraskar.

== Career ==
He was vice-chancellor of Nepal Academy. He retired from the post in 2022.

== Awards ==
- Lekhnath Literary Award
- Nepal Rishi Award
- Kritiman Rastriya Dyuip Dabitiya Third(कीर्तिमय राष्ट्रदीप द्वितीय श्रेणी)
- Suprasidda Prabal Janswas Shree First (सुप्रसिद्ध प्रबल जनसेवाश्री प्रथम श्रेणी) from the President of Nepal
- Dambar Cultural National Award (डम्बर संस्कृति राष्ट्रिय पुरस्कार)
- Ambition National Pride Award (एम्बिसन राष्ट्रिय गौरव सम्मान–२०७६)
- Rastriya Prathiva Puraskar 2010 (राष्ट्रिय प्रतिभा पुरस्कार)

== Publications ==
- Hindu king Parsuram and queen Pamphadevi
