= Mathison =

Mathison is a surname, and may refer to:

- Alonzo J. Mathison (1876–1941), American politician
- Brooke Mathison, fictional character
- Bruce Mathison (born 1959), former American football quarterback
- Cameron Mathison (born 1969), Emmy-nominated actor
- Carrie Mathison, a fictional character from Homeland
- Gordon Mathison (1883–1915), Australian physician, medical researcher, and soldier
- James Mathison (born 1978), Australian television presenter
- John Mathison (1901–1982), New Zealand politician of the Labour Party
- Lisa Mathison (born 1985), professional cyclist
- Melissa Mathison (1950–2015), American screenwriter
- Volney Mathison (1897–1965), American chiropractor

== See also ==
- Matheson (surname)
- Mathieson, surname
