= Pittsburgh Panthers women's soccer =

American college soccer team

- 2025 Pittsburgh Panthers women's soccer team
- Founded: 1996; 30 years ago
- University: University of Pittsburgh
- Head coach: Ben Waldrum (2nd season)
- Conference: ACC
- Location: Pittsburgh, Pennsylvania, US
- Stadium: Ambrose Urbanic Field (capacity: 735)
- Nickname: Panthers
- Colors: Blue and gold
Home	Away

NCAA tournament Quarterfinals
- 2023

NCAA tournament Round of 16
- 2022, 2023

NCAA tournament Round of 32
- 2022, 2023

NCAA tournament appearances
- 2022, 2023

The Pittsburgh Panthers women's soccer team is who represents the University of Pittsburgh in the Atlantic Coast Conference (ACC) at the NCAA Division I level in women's college soccer. The team has never won a conference championship. The Panthers have played in both the ACC and Big East.

== History ==
=== 1990s ===
The Pittsburgh Panthers women's soccer team was founded in 1996 under head coach Roland Sturk and did not play in a conference in the program's first year. The team finished with a 3–16 record. The following year, the team joined the Big East Conference, where Pittsburgh was a full member. The Panthers had fewer losses than their inaugural season, finishing 3–12–3 overall and 2–8–1 in conference play. The team's first conference win came vs. West Virginia on October 8, 1997. 1998 saw continued improvement for the Panthers. The team finished 8–11 overall and 5–7 in conference play. This record was good enough to qualify for the Big East Conference Women's Soccer Tournament. However, the team lost in the quarterfinals. 1999 saw a bit of a regression when the team finished 5–12–1 and 1–4–1 in conference play.

=== 2000s ===
The 2000s began similarly for the Panthers, only winning 6 games and losing 12. Another 1 win conference season was not good enough to qualify for the Big East Tournament. 2001 saw another minor improvement, with the team winning 7 games, and increasing its win tally to 2 in conference play. However, 2002 proved to be a disappointing year when the team finished 4–15, and winless in conference play. In January 2003 head coach Roland Sturk resigned as coach. In March 2003, Sue-Moy Chin was named the Panthers' second head coach. Her first seasons saw small improvements, however, the team lost double digit games in 2003, 2004, and 2005. However, the team increased its conference win totals as well and qualified for the Big East Tournament in 2005 and 2006. Both appearances resulted in quarterfinal exits. 2006 was the team's first season without a losing record. The team finished 8–8–3. The team would again reach the quarterfinal of the Big East Tournament in 2008. The team closed the decade with their first-ever winning season, finishing 8–5–5 overall and 3–3–5 in conference play. It was also the first season the team did not have a losing record in conference play.

=== 2010s ===
The decade opened with another qualification into the Big East Tournament, and another quarterfinal loss. However, the success would be short lived as the team finished with just 2 wins in 2011. This season would be bad enough for the team to hire a third coach in its history, Greg Miller. Miller was previously an assistant at Ohio State. Miller's first year, 2012, saw the team finish 7–10–2 overall. In his second season in charge, the team began play in the Atlantic Coast Conference. In their first season, the Panthers went a winless 0–13 in ACC play. The team made steady progress finishing with 2 conference wins in 2014 and 4 conference wins in 2015. 2015 would also be the team's second overall winning season. The Panthers finished 10–7–1. However, in 2016 and 2017 the team would win one ACC game. After the 2017 season, Miller was fired. In December 2017, Randy Waldrum was hired as the new head coach. Waldrum previously won the NCAA title twice with Notre Dame. However, his first season proved difficult, only winning 4 overall games and finishing 0–10 in ACC play. In his second season, the Panthers posted their first ACC win since 2016, finishing with a 2–6–2 ACC record.

=== 2020s ===
The decade started with a season shortened by the COVID-19 pandemic. The Panthers' season was shortened less than other teams in the conference, as they played eight non-conference games. The team finished tenth overall in the ACC regular season, with a 3–5–0 record. They won all eight of those non-conference games to finish the season with eleven total wins, setting a program record. 2021 saw a return to a more normal schedule for the Panthers and they finished 11–7–0 and 4–6–0 in the ACC to tie for ninth place. Their four conference wins tied for the teams most since they joined the ACC, with the other time being in 2015. In 2022, the Panthers finished 14–5–3 and 5–3–2 in ACC play. The 14 wins were the most in program history at the time, and the five conference wins were tied for the most in program history. They qualified for their first ever ACC Tournament and their first NCAA Tournament in program history. They reached the Round of 16 before falling to Florida State to end their historic season. 2023 would follow in the success of 2022, as the Panthers finished 17–6–1 overall and 6–3–1 in ACC play. This was a program record for wins and conference wins, bettering their marks from the previous season. They again qualified for the ACC and NCAA Tournaments, and recorded their best finishes in those tournaments in program history. They made the Semifinals of the ACC Tournament and Quarterfinals of the NCAA Tournament before being defeated by Florida State in both tournaments. 2024 proved to be a regression for the team as they finished 9–6–3 overall and 3–5–2 in ACC play. They did not qualify for the ACC or NCAA tournaments after qualifying for two straight years. Between the 2024 and 2025 season, Randy Waldrum was promoted to the programs technical director and his son, Ben Waldrum was promoted to head coach. The move did not bring immediate results as the Panthers finished 6–10–2 overall and 2–8–0 in ACC play. Both totals were the lowest so far in the decade.

== Personnel ==
=== Current roster ===
As of January 2, 2026

Note: Flags indicate national team as defined under FIFA eligibility rules; some limited exceptions apply. Players may hold more than one non-FIFA nationality.

No.	Pos.	Nation	Player
0	GK	USA	Ellie Breech
1	GK	USA	Abigail Reisz
2	DF	CAN	Mya Archibald
3	FW	USA	Maya Bright
4	DF	ENG	Holly Tickle
5	DF	FRA	Claire Pannier-Jacquemart
6	MF	FRA	Mariama Dabo
7	FW	CAN	Sofia Doheny
8	FW	USA	Lola Abraham
9	FW	USA	Lucia Wells
10	MF	NED	Roos Wittgen
11	MF	CAN	Magali Gagne
12	DF	USA	Sage Stelzer
13	DF	USA	Maya Bruce
14	DF	USA	Olivia Lee

No.	Pos.	Nation	Player
15	FW	CAN	Adi Bianchin
16	FW	USA	Margaret Wilde
17	MF	USA	Hannah Minogue
18	FW	MAR	Alia Jaidi
19	FW	USA	Emily Cooper
20	MF	NGR	Celine Ottah
21	DF	USA	Katie Zailski
22	FW	USA	Bailey Wagenknecht
23	GK	USA	Krystina Wolf
24	MF	USA	Katie Ellermeyer
26	FW	NGR	Adaobi Judith Okah
27	MF	NGR	Adoo Philomina Yina
28	FW	USA	Ellie Rowlands
30	DF	USA	Sophie Rourke

=== Team management ===
Position	Staff
Technical Director	Randy Waldrum
Head coach	Ben Waldrum
Assistant Coach	Jesse Goleman
Assistant Coach	Brianna Alleyne

== Seasons ==
Season	Head coach	Season result						Tournament results	
Season	Head coach	Overall			Conference			Conference	NCAA
Season	Head coach	Wins	Losses	Ties	Wins	Losses	Ties	Conference	NCAA
Independent
1996	Roland Sturk	3	16	0	No Conference				—
Big East Conference
1997	Roland Sturk	3	12	3	2	8	1	—	—
1998	Roland Sturk	8	11	0	5	7	0	Quarterfinal	—
1999	Roland Sturk	5	12	1	1	4	1	—	—
2000	Roland Sturk	6	12	1	1	5	0	—	—
2001	Roland Sturk	7	9	1	2	4	0	—	—
2002	Roland Sturk	4	15	0	0	6	0	—	—
2003	Sue-Moy Chin	5	10	2	1	4	1	—	—
2004	Sue-Moy Chin	6	10	1	2	7	1	—	—
2005	Sue-Moy Chin	4	11	3	3	6	2	Quarterfinal	—
2006	Sue-Moy Chin	8	8	3	3	6	2	Quarterfinal	—
2007	Sue-Moy Chin	6	10	2	1	8	2	—	—
2008	Sue-Moy Chin	7	12	1	4	6	1	Quarterfinal	—
2009	Sue-Moy Chin	8	5	5	3	3	5	—	—
2010	Sue-Moy Chin	7	11	2	4	6	1	Quarterfinal	—
2011	Sue-Moy Chin	2	13	4	1	8	2	—	—
2012	Greg Miller	7	10	2	2	6	2	—	—
Atlantic Coast Conference (ACC)
2013	Greg Miller	4	14	1	0	13	0	—	—
2014	Greg Miller	6	12	0	2	8	0	—	—
2015	Greg Miller	10	7	1	4	6	0	—	—
2016	Greg Miller	2	15	1	1	9	0	—	—
2017	Greg Miller	3	12	3	0	9	1	—	—
2018	Randy Waldrum	4	12	1	0	10	0	—	—
2019	Randy Waldrum	5	10	3	2	6	2	—	—
2020	Randy Waldrum	11	5	0	3	5	0	—	—
2021	Randy Waldrum	11	7	0	4	6	0	—	—
2022	Randy Waldrum	14	5	3	5	3	2	First round	Round of 16
2023	Randy Waldrum	17	6	1	6	3	1	Semifinal	Quarterfinals
2024	Randy Waldrum	9	6	3	3	5	2	—	—
2025	Ben Waldrum	6	10	2	2	8	0	—	—
Totals		169	226	28	52	123	10		

== Notable alumni ==
=== Current professional players ===
As of January 2, 2026

- (United States) Shaina Ashouri (2014) – Currently with Víkingur
- (United States) Madeline Gravante (2018) – Currently with Vitória
- (United States) Rebecca Bartosh (2019–2020) – Currently with Rome City and Guam international
- (Canada) Amanda West (2019–2023) – Currently with Houston Dash
- (Canada) Anna Bout (2019–2024) – Currently with Vancouver Rise FC
- (United States) Emily Yaple (2020–2022) – Currently with SC Sand
- (Canada) Chloe Minas (2020–2024) – Currently with Montreal Roses FC
- (United States) Sarah Schupansky (2021–2024) – Currently with Gotham FC
- (United States) Samiah Phiri (2022–2025) – Currently with Thonon Évian
- Deborah Abiodun (2023–2024) – Currently with Washington Spirit and Nigeria international
