= Anna Magdalena (given name) =

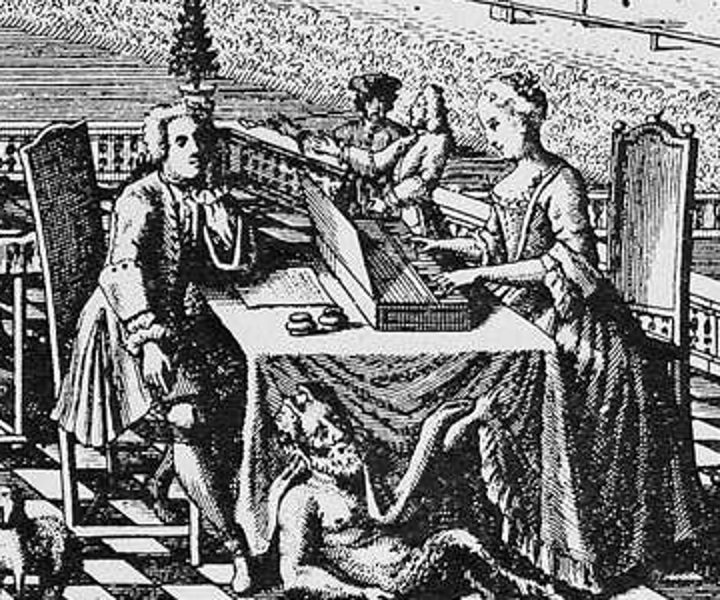
Anna Magdalena Bach, 1736

Anna Magdalena is a given name, based on Anna and Magdalena.

- Anna Magdalena Appel (1846–1917), German ballet dancer, morganatic wife to Louis III, Grand Duke of Hesse
- Anna Magdalena Bach (1701–1760), German singer, second wife of Johann Sebastian Bach
- Anna Magdalena Godiche (1721–1781), Danish publisher
- Anna Magdalena of Hanau-Lichtenberg (1600–1673), German countess
- Anna Magdalena Iljans (born 1969), Swedish skier
- Countess Palatine Anna Magdalena of Birkenfeld-Bischweiler (1640–1693), German countess

== See also ==
- Anna Magdalena, 1998 Hong Kong film
