= Magdalene (given name) =

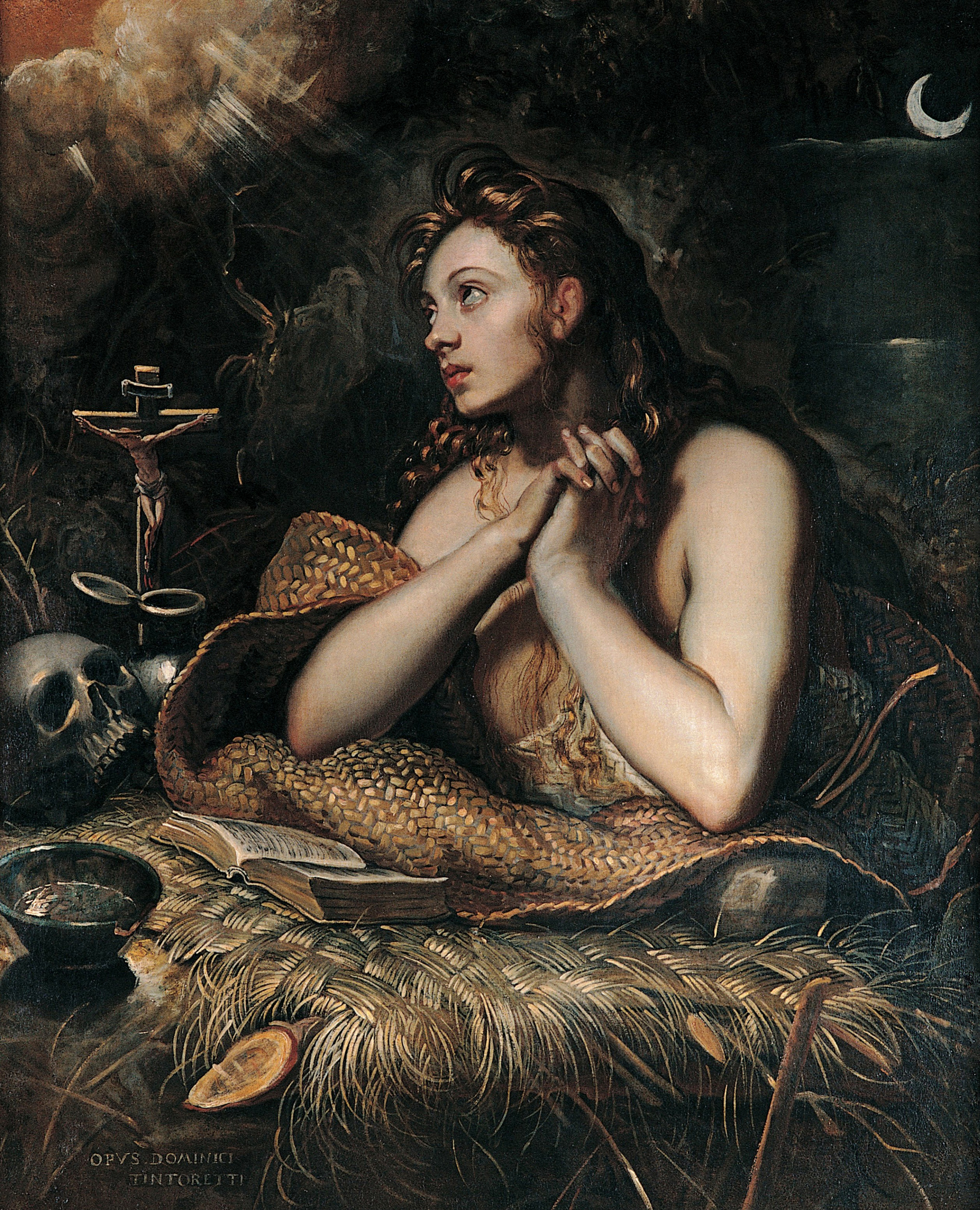
- Mary Magdalene, the saint who is honoured through the name Magdalene, in a painting by Domenico Tintoretto
- Pronunciation: /ˈmæɡdəliːn/ MAG-də-leen, /ˈmæɡdəlɪn/ MAG-də-lin
- Gender: Female

Origin
- Language: Hebrew
- Derivation: Epithet of Mary Magdalene
- Meaning: From the city of Magdala
- Region of origin: Judea

Other names
- Related names: Madeleine, Madeline, Magdalena, Madalena

Magdalene is a feminine given name meaning "from the city of Magdala", referring to the inhabitants of Magdala, a town in Ancient Galilee whose name means "tower" or "elevated, great", and most often identified as the hometown of the biblical figure Mary Magdalene, one of the followers of Jesus and a revered saint in Christian tradition.

For this reason, the name is mostly used in honor of Mary Magdalene in many countries. In France, the name Madeleine is the linguistic variant of Magdalene. Madeleine is also the name of the small sponged cake Madeleine, a traditional cake from the Lorraine region. Madeline is the anglicised form of Madeleine, thus making it a variant of Magdalene.

In the Spanish-speaking world and other countries, the linguistic variant for Magdalene is the given name Magdalena, a name also used in Germany, Poland, Bulgaria, Romania, and the Czech Republic. Madalena is the variant used in Portugal and Brazil.

== People ==
- Mary Magdalene, one of Jesus' followers
- Magdalene of Bavaria, first wife of Wolfgang Wilhelm
- Magdalene of Brandenburg, German noblewoman
- Magdalene of Nagasaki, Japanese martyr and saint
- Magdalene Bärens, Danish artist
- Magdalene Odundo, Kenyan-British potter
- Magdalene Osenbroch (1830–1854), Norwegian actress
- Magdalene Louisa Pietersen (born 1956), South African politician
- Magda Szubanski, Australian actress and TV presenter
- Magdalene Teo, Brunei diplomat

== Fictional characters ==
- Marissa Darrow, also known as Magdalene, a Marvel Comics character
- Magdalene "Queenie" Shaw, a character in the Fast & Furious franchise
- Magdalene O. Moriah, or "Mom", the main antagonist of The Binding of Isaac and its remake.
- Magdalene Druckeryn, a character from the game Pentiment.

== Songs ==
- "Passion Play (When All the Slaves Are Free)" a song by Joni Mitchell
- "The Magdalene Laundries", a song by Joni Mitchell
- "Magdalene (my regal zonophone)", a song by Procol Harum from the album Shine on Brightly
- "Magdalene", a song by Guy Clark from the album Workbench Songs
- "Kyrie for the Magdalene" track by Hans Zimmer from the album The Da Vinci Code
- "Magdalene", a song by The 502s from the album Could It Get Better Than This

== See also ==
- Magdalena (given name)
- Madeline (given name)
- Madeleine (given name)
- Magda (given name)
