= Shaina Ashouri =

American soccer player

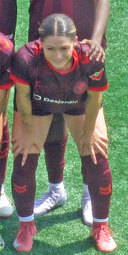
- Ashouri in 2025

Personal information
- Full name: Shaina Faiena Ashouri
- Date of birth: September 12, 1996 (age 30)
- Place of birth: Parker, Colorado, United States
- Height: 5 ft 2 in (1.57 m)
- Position: Forward

Youth career
- Real Colorado

College career
Years	Team	Apps	(Gls)
2014	Pittsburgh Panthers	18	(0)
2015–2016	Wyoming Cowgirls	38	(13)

Senior career*
Years	Team	Apps	(Gls)
2019	TTI Bluebonnets	8	(2)
2020	Athletic Houston FC (men)		
2020	Houston Dash	0	(0)
2020	ŽNK Split	2	(0)
2021	Houston Aces		
2021	Þór/KA	6	(1)
2022–2023	FH	28	(14)
2024	Víkingur	23	(8)
2025	AFC Toronto	9	(0)
2025–	Víkingur	7	(6)
- * Club domestic league appearances and goals as of September 20, 2025

Shaina Faiena Ashouri (born September 12, 1996) is an American soccer player who plays for Víkingur in the Icelandic first tier Besta deild kvenna.

== Early life ==
Ashouri played youth soccer with Real Colorado.

== College career ==
In 2014, Ashouri began attending the University of Pittsburgh, where she played for the women's soccer team. She enrolled a semester early and began studying in January 2014, before joining the women's team for their season in the fall. She made her debut on August 22 against the Akron Zips.

In 2015, Ashouri transferred to the University of Wyoming, where she played for the women's soccer team. She scored her first goal on August 27, 2015, against the Hawaii Rainbow Wahine. In September 2015, she was named the Mountain West Conference Offensive Player of the Week. On September 18, 2015, she scored a hat trick in a 3–0 victory over the Idaho State Bengals. At the end of the 2015 season, she was named to the All-Mountain West Conference First Team and the All-Pacific Region Third Team.

== Club career ==
In 2019, she played with the TTI Bluebonnets in the Women's Premier Soccer League.

She later played with Athletic Houston FC in the men's United Premier Soccer League.

In September 2020, she signed a short-term contract with the Houston Dash in the National Women's Soccer League.

Later in 2020, she joined ŽNK Split of the Croatian Women's First Football League starting the final league game plus making an appearance in the first round match of the UEFA Women's Champions League.

In 2021, she played with the Houston Aces in the WPSL.

In July 2021, she signed with Icelandic club Þór/KA in the first tier Besta deild kvenna.

In December 2021, she signed with FH in the Icelandic second tier 1. deild kvenna for the 2022 season. Halfway through the 2022 season, she was prevented from playing in the remainder of the season due to work permit issues, but after solving the issues, subsequently re-signed with the club for the 2023 season in the first tier, after having earned promotion. In 2023, she served as co-captain of the team, and also led the team in scoring with eight goals.

In March 2024, she joined Víkingur in the Icelandic first tier. After the 2024 season, she departed the Icelandic division, following three and a half seasons, with three different clubs.

In January 2025, she signed with Canadian Northern Super League club AFC Toronto. After starting all nine of the team's matches, where she recorded one assist, Ashouri left Toronto by mutual consent in June 2025.

In July 2025, she returned to Víkingur in the Icelandic first tier.

== International career ==
In 2022, she was called up to a training camp with the Ukraine national team.
