= Idrottsparken (Sundsvall) =

Sports ground in Sundsvall, Sweden

Coordinates: 62°23′39″N 17°18′5″E

- Sundsvalls Idrottspark
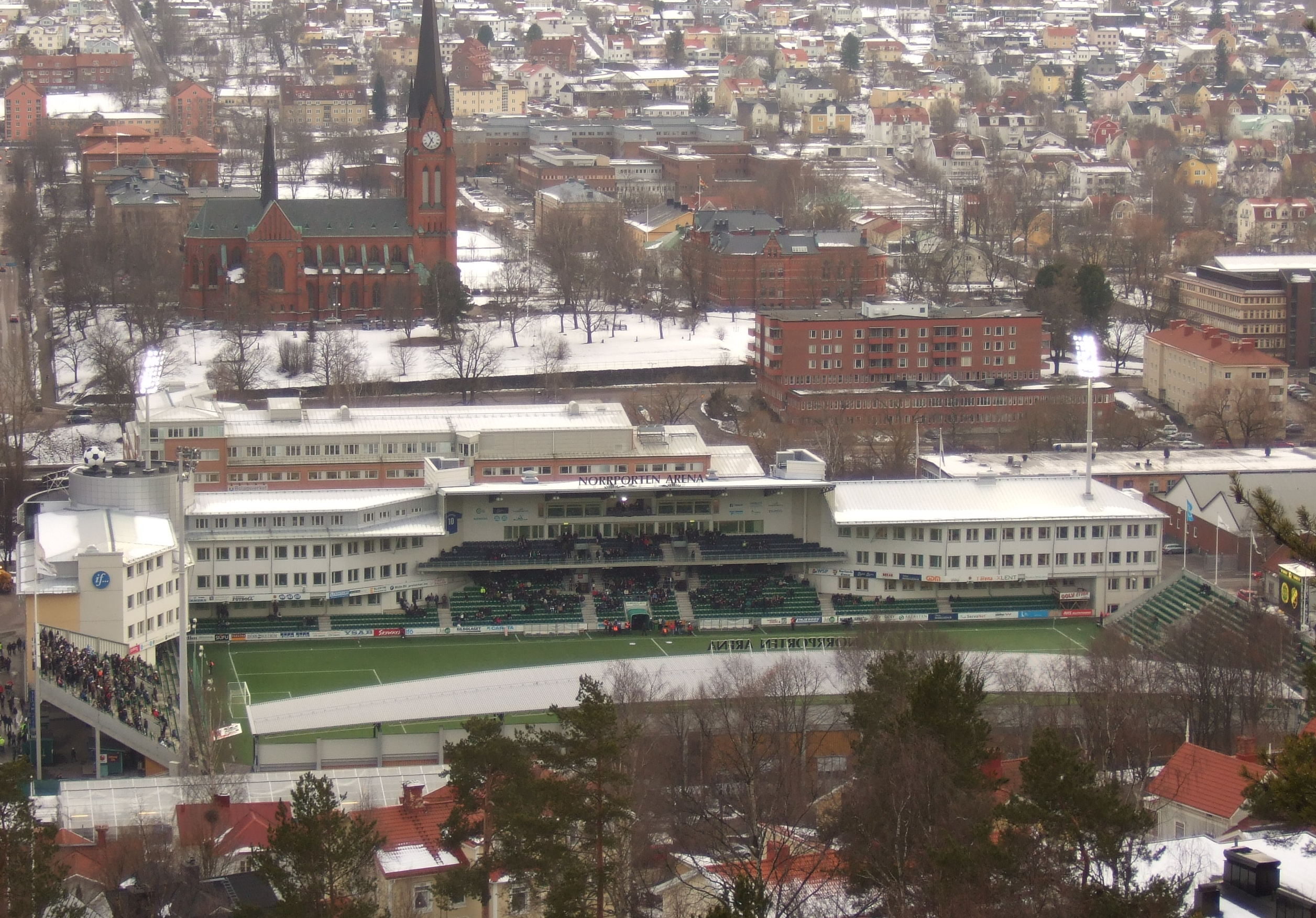
- UEFA Category 3 Stadium
- Interactive map of Idrottsparken
- Former names: Sundsvall Park Arena (during concerts 2002-2006); Norrporten Arena (2006–2016); Idrottsparken (2016-2018)
- Address: Universitetsallén 6, 852 34 Sundsvall
- Location: Sundsvall, Sweden
- Owner: Sundsvall Municipality
- Capacity: 8,000, of which 5,000 are seated under roof
- Surface: Artificial turf
- Record attendance: (Football) 16,507 (GIF Sundsvall vs Högadals IS), 1961 Allsvenskan play-off
- Field size: 105 m x 68 m

Construction
- Opened: 6 August 1903
- Renovated: 2001–2002
- Cost: 150 million SEK

Tenants
- GIF Sundsvall (1903–present); Sundsvalls DFF (1984–present)

Idrottsparken (or Sundsvalls Idrottspark) is a multi-purpose stadium in Sundsvall, Sweden. It was opened on 6 August 1903. It is currently used mostly for football matches and is the home stadium of GIF Sundsvall and Sundsvalls DFF. The stadium holds 8,000 people during football matches.

The stadium was expanded in 2002 and was also called Sundsvall Park Arena during concerts 2002 – 2006.

== History ==
The venue was inaugurated on 6 August 1903, the same year that GIF Sundsvall was founded, and originally also had tracks for running, skittles, shooting and tennis. Idrottsparken underwent a major renovation in the early 2000s and was re-inaugurated by Carl XVI Gustaf on 9 June 2002. The football pitch had grass as its turf until 2004 when it switched to artificial turf, mainly because of the poor quality of the grass turf due to the cold climate.

== Overview ==
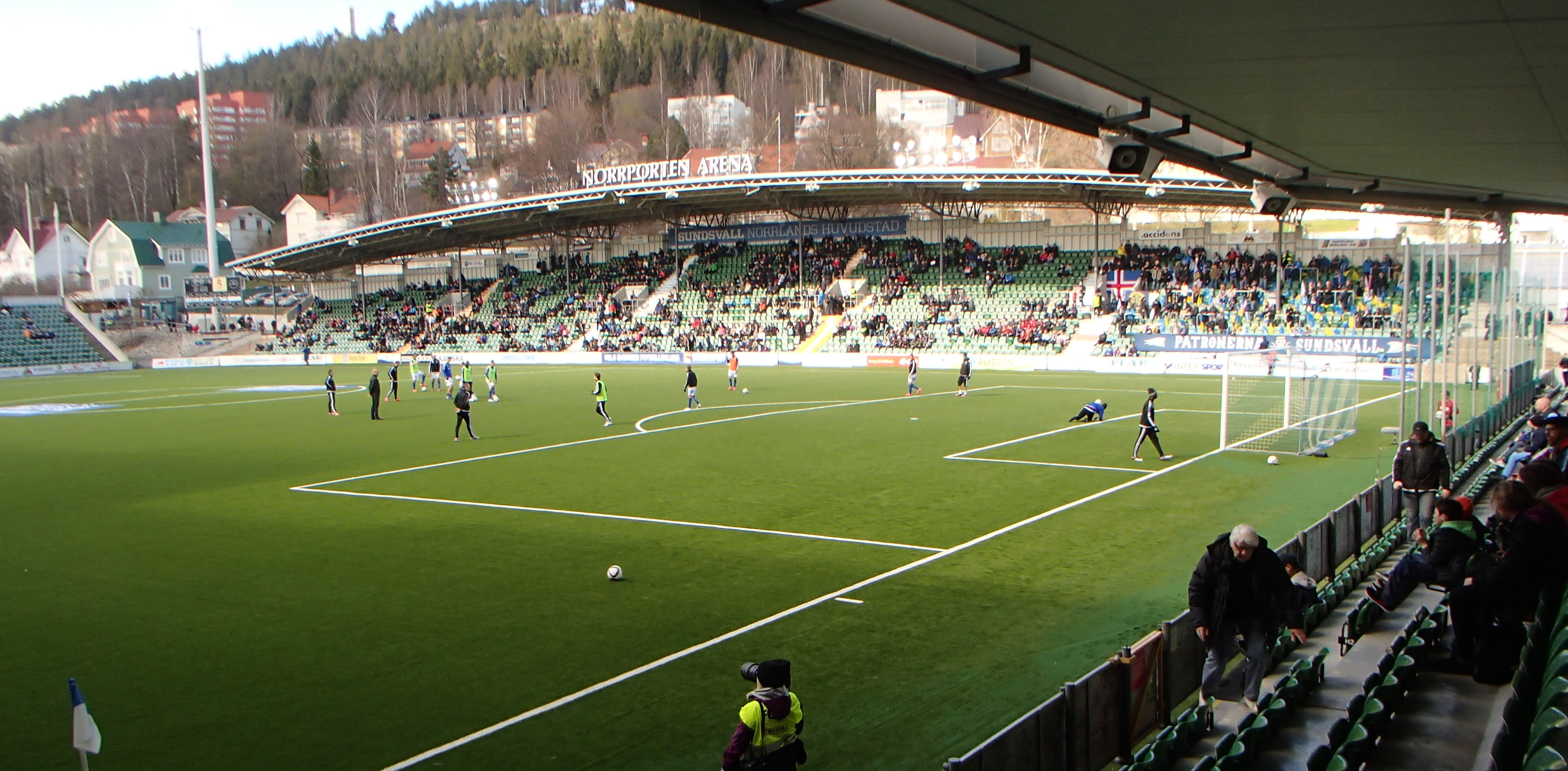
A overview photograph of the stadium during warm up.

== Gallery ==
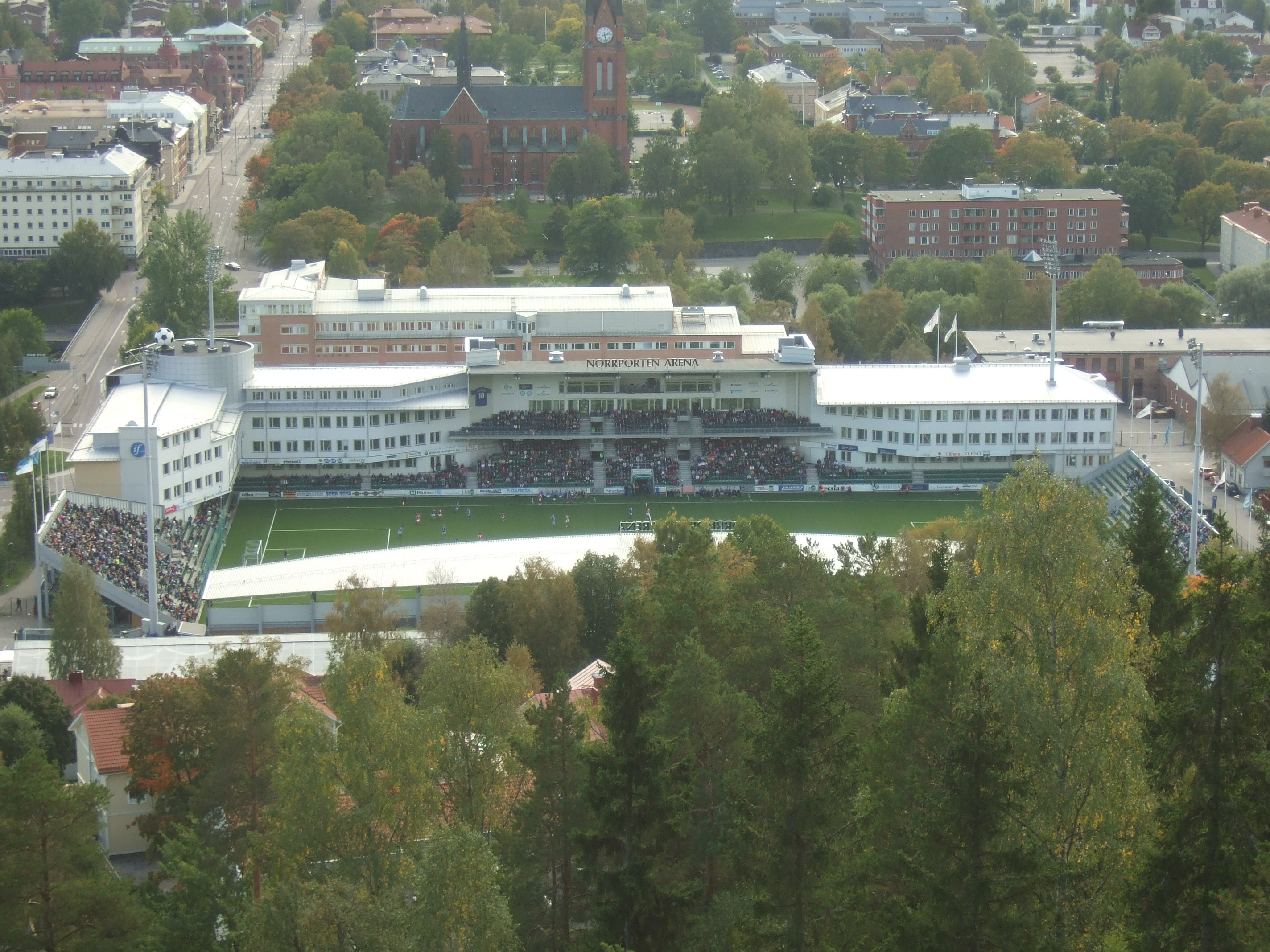
Arena viewed from the north.

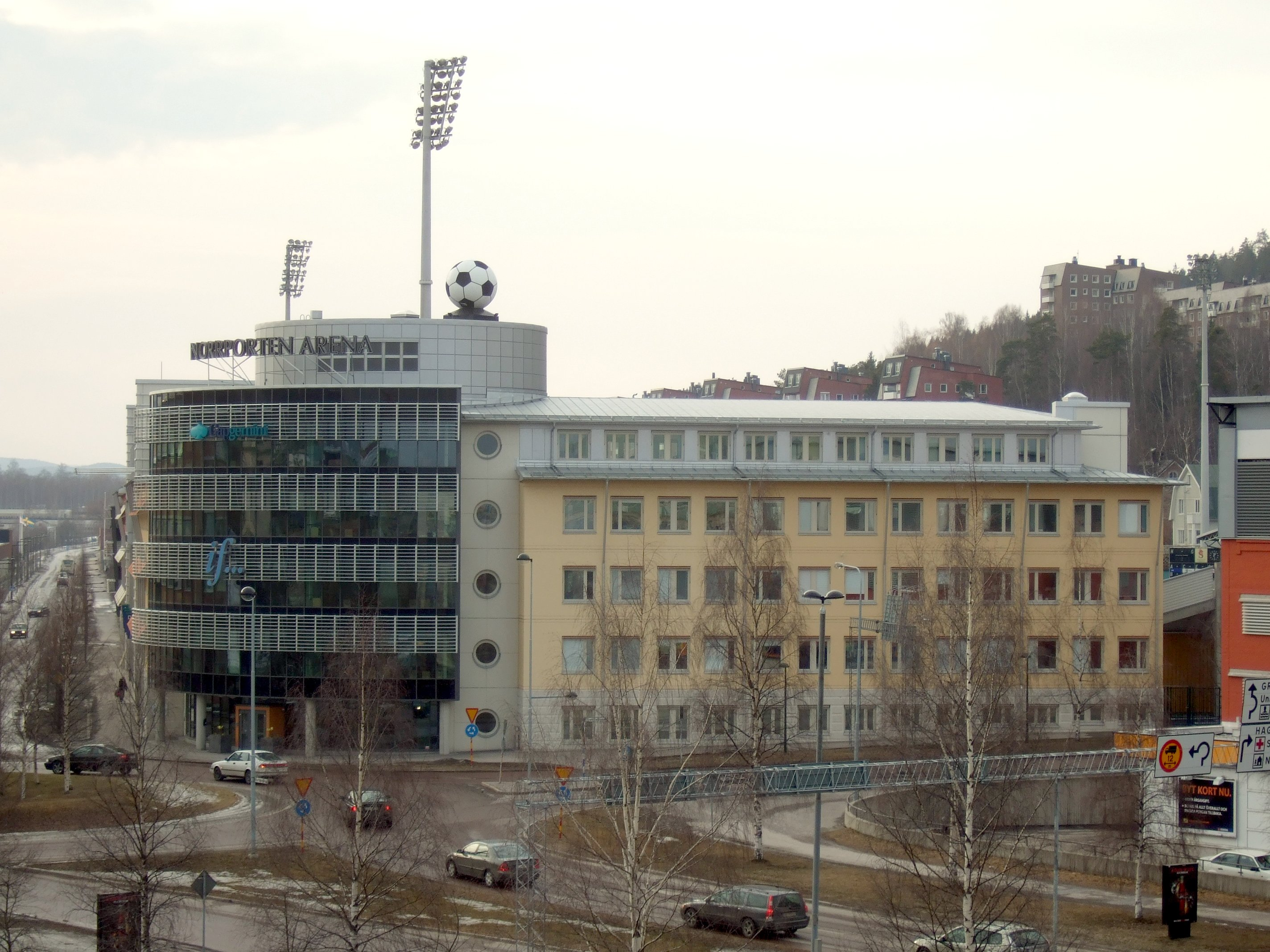
Idrottsparken in 2008.

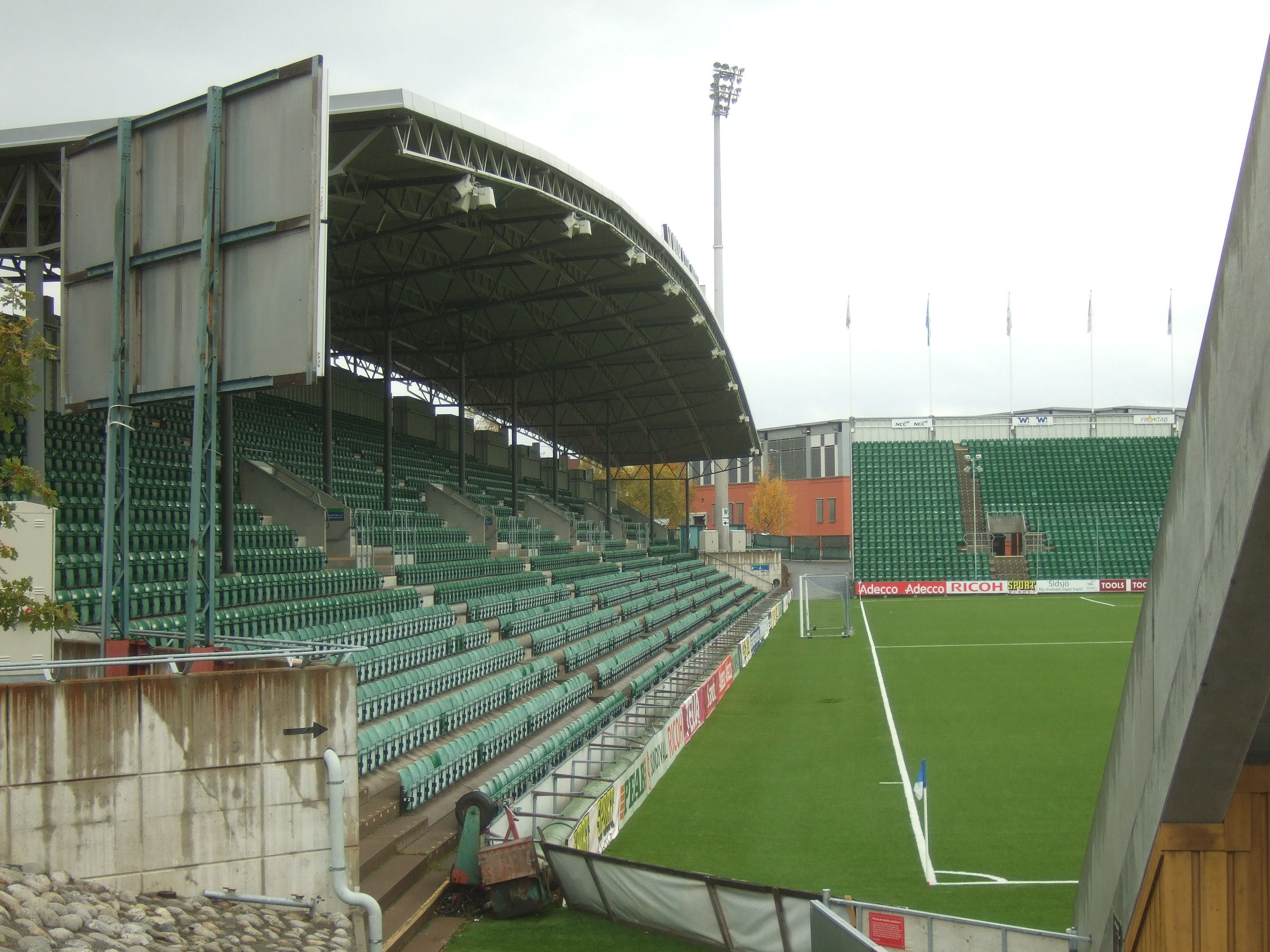
North stand.

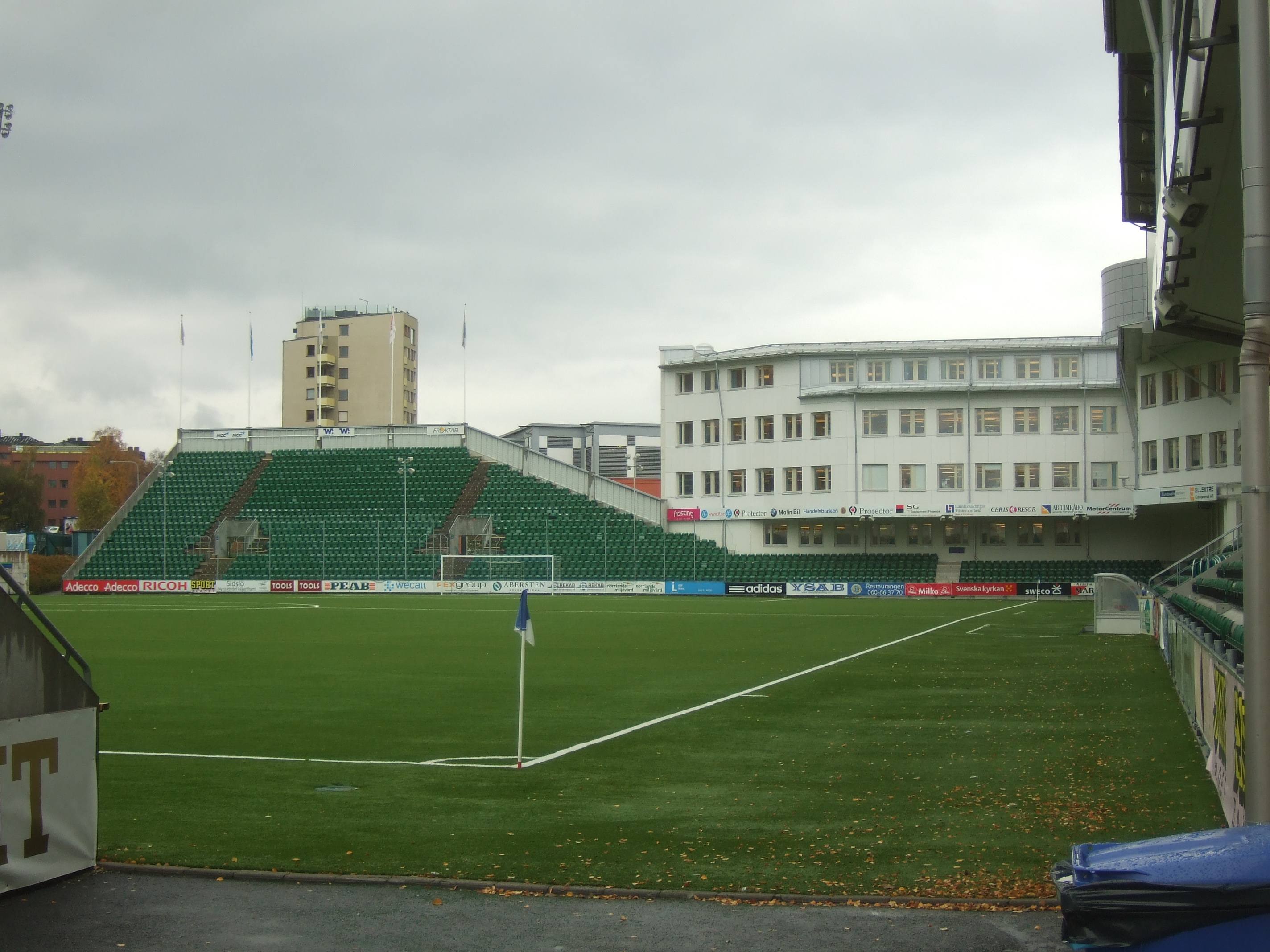
East stand.

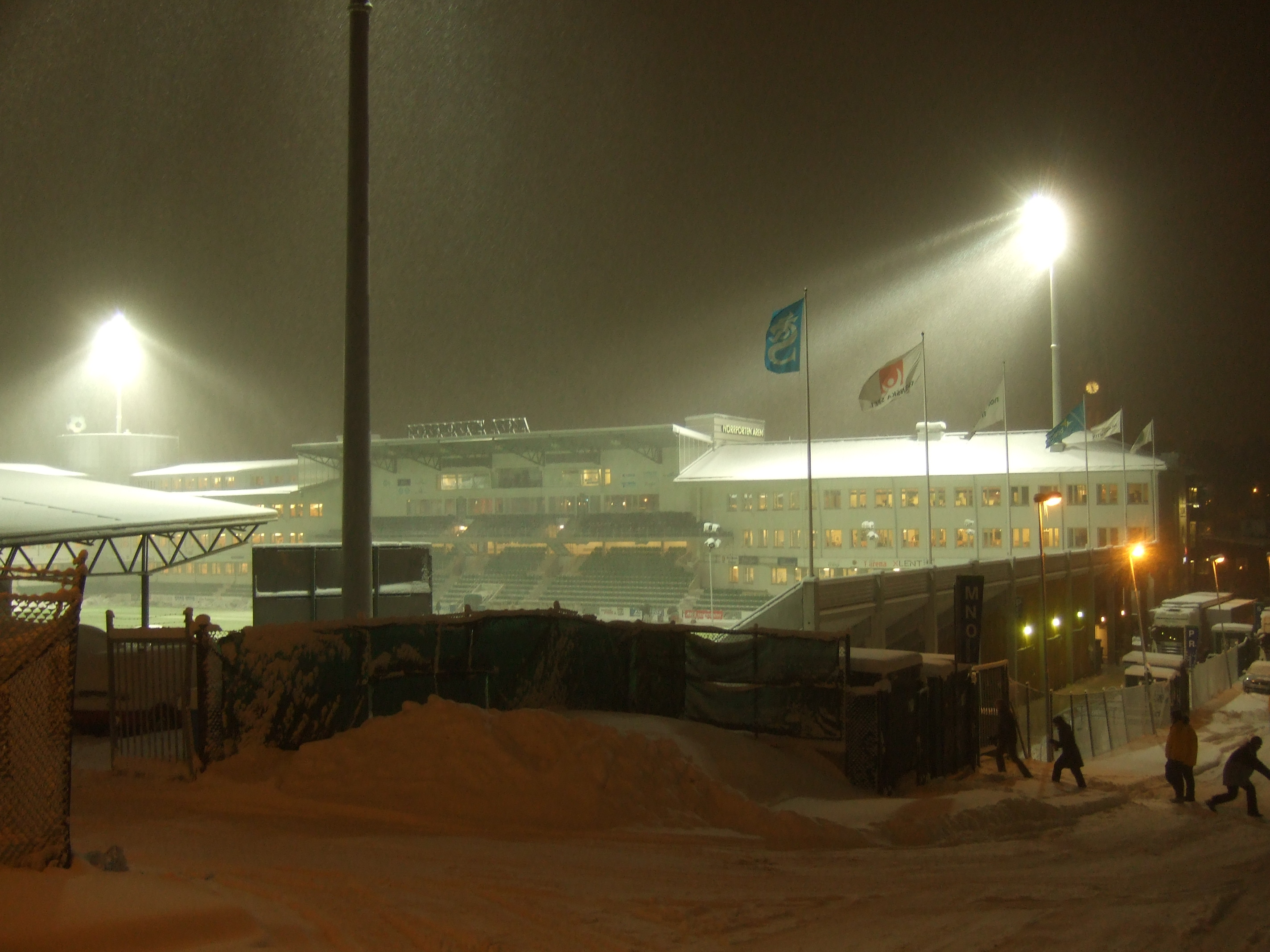
Snowstorm in November 2010.

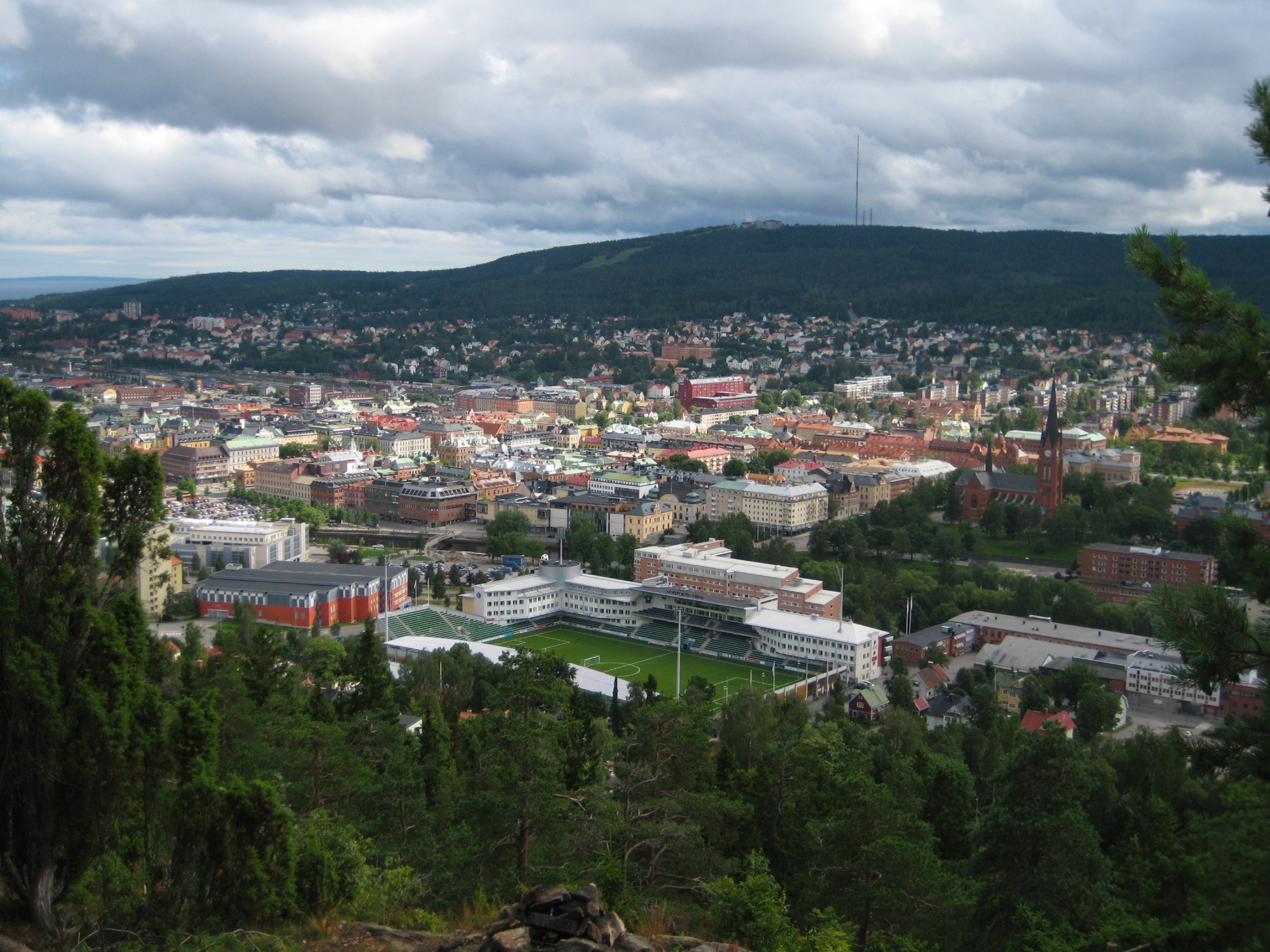
The arena and city of Sundsvall, 2010.

== See also ==
- Allsvenskan
- GIF Sundsvall
- Superettan
