= Magda (given name) =

Magda is a feminine given name. It is a short form of the names Magdalena and Magdalene. Notable people with the name include:

== Arts ==
- Magda Apanowicz (born 1985), Canadian actress
- Magda Danysz (born 1974), French art curator and art dealer
- Magda von Dolcke (1838–1926), Danish actress
- Magda Femme (born 1971), Polish pop singer and songwriter
- Magda Gabor (1915–1997), Hungarian-American actress and socialite
- Magda Giannikou (born 1981), Greek composer, film scorer, singer and musician
- Magda Guzmán (1931–2015), Mexican actress
- Magda Ianculescu (1929–1995), Romanian opera singer and voice teacher
- Magda Isanos (1916–1944), Romanian poet
- Magda Konopka (born 1943), Polish model and actress
- Magda Kun (1912–1945), Hungarian actress
- Magda László (1912–2002), Hungarian opera singer
- Magda Mamet (1916–2012), Mauritian poet
- Magda Olivero (1910–2014), Italian opera singer
- Magda al-Sabahi (1931–2020), Egyptian actress
- Magda Schneider (1909–1996), German actress and singer
- Magda Szabó (1917–2007), Hungarian writer, poet and doctor of philology
- Magda Szubanski (born 1961), Australian actress, comedian and writer
- Magda Tagliaferro (1893–1986), Brazilian pianist
- Magda Umer (1949–2025), Polish singer

== Sports ==
- Magda Cazanga (born 1991), Angolan handball player
- Magda Genuin (born 1979), Italian cross-country skier
- Magda Ilands (born 1950), Belgian long-distance runner
- Magda Lenkei (1916–1998), Hungarian swimmer
- Magda Linette (born 1992), Polish tennis player
- Magda Maros (born 1951), Hungarian fencer
- Magda Mihalache (born 1981), Romanian tennis player
- Magda Rurac (1918–1995), Romanian tennis player

== Other ==
- Magda Ádám (1925–2017), Hungarian historian
- Magda B. Arnold (1903–2002), Canadian psychologist
- Magda Berndsen (born 1950), Dutch politician
- Magda Gerber (1910–2007), Hungarian-American early childhood educator
- Magda Goebbels (1901–1945), wife of Nazi Germany's Minister of Propaganda Joseph Goebbels
- Magda Lupescu (1899–1977), later Princess Elena of Romania, mistress and later wife of King Carol II of Romania
- Magda Peligrad, Romanian mathematician and mathematical statistician
- Magda Popeanu (born 1956), Romanian-Canadian politician
- Magda Wierzycka (born 1969), South African businesswoman

== Fictional characters ==
- Magda Lehnsherr, deceased wife of Magneto (Marvel Comics), and mother of the Scarlet Witch and Quicksilver (Marvel Comics)
- Magda Miłowicz, title character of Magda M., a Polish soap opera (2005–2007)

== See also ==
- Sinéad O'Connor (1966–2023), Irish singer-songwriter, named Magda Davitt in 2017–2018
