= Sundsvalls DFF =

- Full name: Sundsvalls Damfotbollsförening
- Founded: 1984
- Ground: Norrporten Arena, Sundsvall
- Capacity: 8,034
- Manager: Patrik Jonsson
- League: Division 1
- 2024: 13th in Elitettan (relegated)
Home colours	Away colours

Sundsvalls Damfotbollsförening, commonly known as Sundsvalls DFF, is a women's association football club from Sundsvall, Sweden. The club was established in 1984 by GIF Sundsvall. The club played in the Damallsvenskan during the 1991 season. It was relegated to the Division 1 following the 1992 season.

Sundsvalls DFF play their home games at the Norrporten Arena in Sundsvall. The team colors are blue and white.

== Current squad ==
As of 12 May 2024

Note: Flags indicate national team as defined under FIFA eligibility rules; some limited exceptions apply. Players may hold more than one non-FIFA nationality.

No.	Pos.	Nation	Player
1	GK	SWE	Lisen Hafstad
2	DF	FIN	Juulia Grönlund
3	FW	NGA	Ebere Orji
4	FW	SWE	Jennifer Olofsson
5	DF	SWE	Sophie Brundin
6	MF	SWE	Josefin Edin
7	MF	SWE	Tea Stafrin
8	MF	SWE	Astrid Winter
9	FW	SWE	Ida Åkerlund
10	MF	FIN	Elli Näsman
11	MF	SWE	Elin Larsson
12	FW	SWE	Carine Rugumaho

No.	Pos.	Nation	Player
14	MF	USA	Hannah Tillett (captain)
16	DF	SWE	Ida Sundqvist Westerberg
17	MF	SWE	Elina Boije
18	GK	FIN	Elin Gripenberg
19	DF	SWE	Tyra Lindqvist
20	FW	SWE	Linnea Sahlin
21	MF	SWE	Frida Svensk
21	MF	SWE	Madeline Gravante
23	MF	SWE	Lovisa Aronsson
24	DF	SWE	Amanda Hagelberg
99	GK	SWE	Cornelia Sundelius
