= Leni (name) =

Leni is both a given name and a surname. Notable people with the name include:

== Given name ==
Male and female:

- Leni Alexander (1924–2005), Chilean composer
- Leni Apisai (born 1996), New Zealand rugby union player
- Leni Björklund (born 1944), Swedish politician
- Leni Harper (born 1954), Scottish actress
- Leni Junker (1905–1997), German runner
- Leni Kokkes-Hanepen (born 1934), Dutch fencer
- Leni Klum (born 2005), German-American model
- Leni Larsen Kaurin (born 1981), Norwegian footballer
- Leni Lohmar (1914–2006), German swimmer
- Leni Lynn (1923–2010), American actress
- Leni Parker (born 1966), Canadian actress
- Leni Riefenstahl (1902–2003), German director
- Leni Robredo (born 1965), 14th Vice President of the Philippines
- Leni Schmidt (1906–1985), German athlete
- Leni Shida (born 1994), Ugandan sprinter
- Leni Sinclair (born 1940), American photographer
- Leni Stengel (1901–1982), American actress
- Leni Stern (born 1952), German musician
- Leni Yahil (1912–2007), Israeli historian
- Leni Zumas, American novelist
- Tamaseu Leni Warren, Samoan swimmer

== Surname ==
- Nollen Cornelius Leni, Solomon Islander politician
- Paul Leni (1885–1929), German director

== Fictional characters ==
- Leni Loud, a character in the American animated series The Loud House
- Leni McClearly, identical twin sister of Gina McClearly in the 2022 Netflix miniseries Echoes
- Leni, the nurse in Franz Kafka's novel The Trial
