= Madeline Gravante =

American soccer player (born 1999)

Personal information
- Full name: Madeline Kate Gravante
- Date of birth: September 13, 1999 (age 27)
- Height: 5 ft 8 in (1.73 m)
- Position: Defender

Team information
- Current team: Vitória
- Number: 13

Youth career
- 2010–2014: Staten Island United Gunners
- 2014–2016: Albertson Fury
- 2017–2018: FC Fury

College career
Years	Team	Apps	(Gls)
2018	Pittsburgh Panthers	17	(2)
2019	Florida Gators	6	(0)
2020–2022	Oregon Ducks	3	(0)

Senior career*
Years	Team	Apps	(Gls)
2022	Eugene Timbers		
2023	Brooklyn City FC		
2024	Sundsvalls DFF	18	(0)
2025	Levante UD	2	(0)
2025–	Vitória	12	(1)
- * Club domestic league appearances and goals as of 16:05, March 30, 2026 (UTC)

Madeline Kate Gravante (born September 13, 1999) is an American professional soccer player who plays as a defender for Campeonato Nacional Feminino club Vitória. She played college soccer for the Pittsburgh Panthers, Florida Gators, and Oregon Ducks before starting her professional career abroad with Swedish club Sundsvalls DFF and Spanish club Levante UD.

== Early life ==
One of five children born to Richard Gravante and Mary Looby, Gravante grew up in Staten Island, New York. She started playing club soccer for the Staten Island United Gunners boys' team before moving to ECNL team Albertson Fury in 2014. Gravante attended St. Joseph Hill Academy, where she played for the school's soccer team as either a midfielder or defender. Known for her ability to score from free kicks, she earned all-state honors in the 2015 season.

Halfway through her sophomore year of high school, Gravante transferred to the Notre Dame Academy. She was not able to play for the team as a junior due to transfer policies, but still trained with Notre Dame's squad as a non-rostered player. Ultimately, Gravante never saw the field for Notre Dame, with her club team, Albertson Fury, demanding her full commitment and requiring her to forfeit her remaining high school eligibility. She would later go on to switch clubs and played for FC Fury in 2017 and 2018.

== College career ==
In her first season playing collegiately, Gravante appeared in all 17 of the Pittsburgh Panthers' matches and racked up a total of 1,430 minutes. She was one of only two Panthers to start every game of the campaign. On September 6, 2018, she scored both goals in a 2–0 victory over Duquesne after head coach Randy Waldrum chose to deploy her at forward for the first time that year. Gravante's two goals, which would end up being the only two of her college career, were tied for second on Pitt's scoring leaderboard at the end of the year.

Ahead of the 2019 season, Gravante transferred to the University of Florida. She made 6 appearances for the Gators, all of which were as a substitute. On October 13, 2019, she registered a season-high 25 minutes against Kentucky.

Gravante entered the transfer portal once again after a single season with Florida. She ended up moving to the University of Oregon, redshirting the 2021 spring season due to NCAA transfer rules. Gravante did not appear for the Ducks in the 2021 fall season either. After nearly three years since playing in a collegiate match, Gravante debuted for Oregon in a season-opening victory over New Mexico State in August 2022. She made 2 more appearances as a Duck, including one start, to round out her college career.

== Club career ==
In the offseason before her final year of college, Gravante played for pre-professional club Eugene Timbers. The following year, she joined Brooklyn City FC for the 2023 Women's Premier Soccer League season. After departing from the University of Oregon, Gravante signed her first professional contract for Swedish second-division club Sundsvalls DFF. She made 18 Elitettan appearances in her single season in Sweden.

Gravante joined Spanish club Levante UD in January 2025, penning a contract lasting through the end of the 2024–25 Liga F season. Her signing was part of a set of last-minute transfers from Levante in a quest to avoid relegation to the Primera Federación. On 8 February 2025, Gravante made her Liga F debut, coming on as a late-game substitute for María Molina in a 2–1 loss to Real Madrid. After making one further appearance and recording 26 minutes of playing time, Gravante departed from Levante at the end of the season.

On 24 August 2025, Portuguese Campeonato Nacional Feminino club Vitória announced the signing of Gravante. On 1 November 2025, Gravante scored her first professional goal, helping Vitória earn a 3–1 comeback win over Damaiense as its first victory of the season. In July 2026, she renewed her contract with the club for a second season.
