= Madlyn =

Madlyn is a given name, and may refer to:

- Madlyn Davis (c. 1899–?), American blues singer
- Madlyn O'Hare (also Madalyn Murray O'Hair; 1919–1995), American atheist activist
- Madlyn M. Kahr (1913–2004), American art historian, and educator
- Madlyn Rhue (1935–2003), American film and television actress

== See also ==
- Madelyn (given name)
