= Madeline Stratton Morris =

American educator

- Born: Madeline Robinson; August 14, 1906; Chicago, Illinois, U.S.
- Died: December 26, 2007 (age 101); Chicago, Illinois, U.S.
- Other names: Madeline Morgan
- Occupation(s): Educator, community leader

Madeline Robinson Morgan Stratton Morris (August 14, 1906 – December 26, 2007) was an American educator and community leader, based in Chicago. In the 1940s, she created the first Black history curriculum adopted by a large American school district, and published two textbooks for the subject.

== Early life and education ==
Robinson was born in Chicago, the daughter of John Henry Robinson and Estella Mae Dixon Robinson. She graduated from Englewood High School and trained for a teaching career at Chicago Normal College, earning her certificate in 1929. She earned a bachelor's degree from Northwestern University in 1936, and a master's degree in education in 1941, also from Northwestern. She pursued further studies at the University of Chicago. She was a member of Phi Delta Kappa, and received the sorority's first national Achievement Award in 1944.

== Career ==
Morgan taught in the Chicago Public Schools system from 1933 until she retired in 1968. In 1942, she introduced her first "Supplementary Units for a Course in Social Studies," curriculum prepared for covering Black history in American history classes. They were the first such course materials used in a major American city's schools. Carter G. Woodson praised her work. She also worked on mandatory lessons to build intercultural and interracial cooperation. Stratton was nominated for the 1943 Spingarn Medal for this work. "It is the duty of education to give to youth the knowledge of achievement of persons of all races, creeds and color," she said in 1944. "If books fail in this respect, they are inadequate." In 1945, her work was an impetus for a state law allowing Black history as a classroom subject in Illinois public schools. From 1958 to 1960 she was a member of the Human Rights Committee of the Chicago Board of Education. She wrote two textbooks, Strides Forward and Negroes Who Helped Build America.

From 1946 to 1948, Stratton was president of Chicago's chapter of the National Council of Negro Women (NCNW). In 1947, she was named to the NCNW's national honor roll of twelve outstanding women, alongside Ingrid Bergman, Marian Anderson, Selma Burke, and Vijaya Lakshmi Pandit. She was invited to the White House for a civil rights conference in 1966. After she retired from school work, she taught education and history courses at the post-secondary level, at Triton College, Mayfair College, Chicago State University, and Governors State University. In 1980, she was a delegate to the Democratic National Convention. In 2003, she gave an oral history interview to "The HistoryMakers" project.

== Publications ==
- "Teaching Negro History in Chicago Public Schools" (1943)
- "Chicago School Curriculum Includes Negro Achievements" (1944)
- "Chicago Schools Teach Negro History" (1944)
- Negroes Who Helped Build America (1965)
- Strides Forward: Afro-American Biographies (1973)

== Personal life ==
Robinson married three times. She was married to Thomas Morgan from 1926 to 1943; they divorced. She was married to educator Samuel B. Stratton from 1946 to 1972, when he died. She was married to Walter Morris from 1981 to 1983, when he died. She died in 2007, at the age of 101, at her Chicago home. Her papers are in the collection of the Chicago Public Library. A biography of Morris was published in 2022. She was also a prominent figure in Ian Rocksborough-Smith's Black Public History in Chicago (2018), and her photograph appears on the book's cover.
