= Madeleine Marzin =

French trade unionist, communist activist, and deputy (1908–1998)

- Marzin's National Assembly portrait

Deputy of the National Assembly for the Department of Seine
- In office 17 June 1951 – 8 December 1958

Personal details
- Born: Madeleine Marie Marzin; 21 July 1908 Loudéac, Côtes-du-Nord, France
- Died: 27 May 1998 (aged 89) Paris, France
- Party: French Communist Party (PCF)
- Occupation: Teacher

Madeleine Marie Marzin (21 July 1908 – 27 May 1998) was a French teacher, a trade unionist, and an underground communist activist in the French Resistance during World War II. After the war, she was elected as a deputy to the National Assembly for Seine.

== Early life and trade unionism ==
Marzin was born in 1908 in Loudéac, Côtes-du-Nord, France. She had four brothers, one of whom later joined the French Resistance and was deported. Her father, a shopkeeper, died of tuberculosis in 1926, the same year that Marzin left to attend college.

From 1926 to 1929, Marzin trained to be a teacher at a college in Saint-Brieuc. After graduation, she taught at a school in the 18th arrondissement of Paris and then later transferred to a school in the suburb of Le Plessis-Robinson in the Seine department. She was a member of the Seine teachers' union and served as the union's treasurer from 1933 to 1934.

Marzin fell ill around 1937 and spent three years recovering in a sanitorium in Sainte-Feyre, allegedly recovering from tuberculosis. During this time, she joined a mutual aide organization for people on long-term sick leave (l'Association des malades en congé de longue durée, or the ACLD) and wrote articles for the ACLD and the Syndicat national des instituteurs (transl. National Teachers' Union).

== French Resistance ==
On 31 May 1942, Marzin and the French Communist Party organized the Manifestation de la rue de Buci, a demonstration of women in occupied Paris during World War II. The women rushed into a grocery store and looted sardine tins, leading to a deadly confrontation between police officers and armed men in the crowd that left two officers dead. She was arrested and sentenced to death for her involvement, but Marshal Pétain, the leader of the Vichy government, granted her clemency. Still, she remained in prison. In August 1942, she managed to escape while being transported to the prison in Rennes. Afterwards, she disappeared for 17 months, resurfacing again in early 1944 after she was sent by the Communist Party to lead women of the Resistance in eastern France.

== Political career and death ==
After World War II, Marzin was elected to political office: first as a local councilor and then as a deputy of the National Assembly for the department of Seine. She died in Paris on 27 May 1998.
