= Madelyn =

Madelyn or Madalyn is a feminine first name, a variant of Madeline or Madeleine. Notable people with these names include:

== Madelyn ==
- Madelyn Clare (1894–1975), American actress
- Madelyn Cline (born 1997), American actress
- Maddy Curley (born 1981), American actress
- Madelyn Desiano (born 2000), American soccer player
- Madelyn Deutch (born 1991), American actress
- Madelyn Dunham (1922–2008), maternal grandmother of Barack Obama
- Madelyn Pugh (1921–2011), American television writer who worked on the I Love Lucy television series
- Madelyn Renee (born 1955), American soprano formerly known as Madelyn Renée Monti
- Madelyn Rosenberg (born 1966), American author

== Madalyn ==
- Madalyn Aslan (born 1963), American-British writer, astrologer, and palmist
- Madalyn Godby (born 1992), American track cyclist
- Madalyn Murray O'Hair (1919–1995), American writer and activist
- Madalyn Schiffel (born 1994), American soccer goalkeeper

== Fictional characters ==
- Madelyn "Maddie" Hayes, in the television series Moonlighting
- Madelyn Stillwell, in the television series The Boys and The Boys Presents: Diabolical
- Madelyn Spaulding, a villain from Static Shock

== See also ==
- Madlyn (given name)
