= Madhi railway station =

Railway Station in Gujarat, India

General information
- Location: Madhi, Tapi district India
- Coordinates: 21°08′45″N 73°14′33″E
- Elevation: 45 metres (148 ft)
- System: Indian Railways station
- Owner: Ministry of Railways, Indian Railways
- Operator: Western Railway
- Line: Udhna–Jalgaon line
- Platforms: 3
- Tracks: 3

Construction
- Structure type: Standard (on ground station)
- Parking: Yes

Other information
- Status: Functioning
- Station code: MID
- Zone(s): Western Railway
- Division(s): Mumbai WR
Location
- Location within India Location within Gujarat

Madhi railway station is a railway station in the Tapi district of the Gujarat state in India. It is under the Mumbai WR railway division of the Western Railway Zone of Indian Railways. Madhi railway station is 15 km far away from Vyara. It is located on the Udhna-Jalgaon main line of the Indian Railways.

It is located at 45 m above sea level and has three platforms. As of 2016, electrified double broad-gauge railway line exists at this station. Passenger, MEMU and Superfast trains halt here.

== See also ==
- Tapi district
