= Madi language =

Madi may refer to several unrelated languages:

- Madí language, an Arawan language of Brazil
- Maʼdi language, a Nilo-Saharan language of Uganda and South Sudan
- Gira language, also known as Madi, a Finisterre language Papua New Guinea
- Madi, a subdivision of Arawan languages, spoken in Brazil and Peru

== See also ==
- Madhi Madhi language, or Madi Madi, a language of Australia
