= Magdalena (given name) =

- World map showing the countries where the names Magdalena, Madeleine, Magdalene, Madeline, Madalena are popular. Any color means the name is among the 100 most popular names either in the population or among newborns.
- Language: West Slavic (Czech, Polish and Slovak), Hungarian, German, Lithuanian, Dutch, Swedish, Norwegian, Spanish, Georgian

Other names
- Variant form: Magdalene
- Derived: Surname of Mary Magdalene

Magdalena is the original version of the given name Magdalene and is used in West Slavic (Czech, Polish and Slovak), Hungarian, German, Lithuanian, Dutch, Swedish, Norwegian, Spanish, Georgian, and other languages.

Notable persons with the name include:

- Archduchess Magdalena of Austria (1532–1590), abbess
- Magdalena Abakanowicz (1930–2017), Polish sculptor
- Magdalena Aicega (born 1973), Argentinian field hockey player
- Magdalena Álvarez (born 1952), Spanish politician
- Magdalena Andersdotter (1590–1650), Norwegian shipowner
- Magdalena Andersson (Moderate) (born 1954), Swedish politician
- Magdalena Andersson (born 1967), Swedish politician, Prime Minister 2021–2022
- Magdalena Avietėnaitė (1892–1984), Lithuanian journalist, diplomat and a public figure
- Magdalena Barreiro, Ecuadoran Economy Minister and professor
- Magdalena Bartoş (born 1954), Romanian fencer
- Magdalena Hergert Becker (1878–1938), American pioneer missionary
- Magdalena Bendzisławska (fl. 17th century) First woman to become a Polish barber-surgeon
- Magdalena Białas (born 1962), Polish swimmer
- Magdaléna Borová (born 1981), Czech actress
- Magdalena Cielecka (born 1972), Polish film and theatre actress
- Magdalena de la Cruz (1487–1560), Spanish nun
- Magdalena Decilio (born 1983), Argentinian handball player
- Magdalena Eriksson (born 1993), Swedish footballer
- Magdalena Feistel (born 1970), Polish tennis player
- Magdalena Forsberg (born 1967), Swedish cross country skier and biathlete
- Magdalena Frackowiak (born 1984), Polish fashion model
- Magdalena Fransson (born 1972), Swedish politician
- Magdalena Fręch (born 1997), Polish tennis player
- Magdalena Fularczyk (born 1986), Polish rower
- Magdalena Rosina Funck (1672–1695), German botanical illustrator
- Magdalena Georgieva (born 1962), Bulgarian rower
- Magdalena de Guzmán (around 1550–1621), Spanish courtier
- Magdalena Graaf (born 1975), Swedish model, singer, and author
- Magdalena Grant (born 1987), Chilean journalist
- Magdalena Grzybowska (born 1978), Polish tennis player
- Magdaléna Hajóssyová (born 1946), Slovak singer
- Magdalena Hermelin (born 1975), Swedish politician
- Magdalena Sibylla of Hesse-Darmstadt (1652–1712), regent of the Duchy of Württemberg and German composer of baroque hymns
- Magdalena Jalandoni (1891–1978), Filipino writer
- Magdalena Kemnitz (born 1985), Polish rower
- Magdalena Khristova (born 1977), Bulgarian athlete
- Magdalena Kiszczyńska (born 1988), Polish tennis player
- Magdalena Kochan (born 1950), Polish politician
- Magdalena Kopp (1948–2015), German photographer and member of the Frankfurt Revolutionary Cells
- Magdalena Kožená (born 1973), Czech singer
- Magdalena Kozioł (born 1981), Polish judoka
- Magdalena Krukowska, Polish sprint canoeist
- Magdalena Kuras (born 1988), Swedish swimmer
- Magdalena Lamparska (born 1988), Polish film and theater actress
- Magdalena Lewy-Boulet (born 1973), American runner
- Magdalena Luther (1529–1542), third child of German priest Martin Luther
- Magdalena Majewska (born 1963), Polish journalist
- Magdalena Maleeva (born 1975), Bulgarian tennis player
- Magdalena Matschina (born 2005), German luger
- Magdalena Matte (born 1950), Chilean civil engineer, businesswoman and politician
- Magdalena Mielcarz (born 1978), Polish actress and model
- Magdalena Mikloş (born 1948), Romanian handball player
- Magdalena Moons (1541–1613), famous for her role during the Dutch war of liberation
- Magdalena Ortega de Nariño (1762–1811), wife of Antonio Nariño
- Magdalena Sibylla of Neidschutz (1675–1694), German noblewoman and the mistress of John George IV, Elector of Saxony
- Magdalena Neuner (born 1987), German biathlete
- Magdalena Nieć, Polish actress
- Magdalena Pajala (born 1988), Swedish cross country skier
- Magdalena Paraschiv (born 1982), Romanian handball player
- Magdalena van de Passe (1600–1638), Dutch engraver
- Magdalena de Pazzi (1566–1607), Italian saint
- Magdalena Petit (1903–1968), Chilean writer
- Magdalena Rădulescu (1902–1983), Romanian painter
- Magdalena Dobromila Rettigová (1785–1845), Czech cookbook writer
- Magdalena Rivas, American model
- Magdalena Różczka (born 1978), Polish actress
- Magdalena Rudenschöld (1766–1823), Swedish member of the nobility and a lady-in-waiting
- Magdaléna Rybáriková (born 1988), Slovak tennis player
- Magdalena Sadłecka (born 1982), Polish mountain biker
- Magdalena Samozwaniec (1894–1972), Polish writer
- Magdalena Sánchez (1915–2005), Venezuelan singer
- Magdalena of Saxony (1507–1534), Margravine of Brandenburg, its "Electoral Princess"
- Magdalena Schmidt (born 1949), German gymnast
- Magdalena Schnurr (born 1992), German ski jumper
- Magdalena Schröder (born 1990), Swedish politician
- Magdalena Sibylle of Saxe-Weissenfels (1648–1681), German noblewoman
- Magdalena Śliwa (born 1969), Polish volleyball player
- Magdalena Solís, Mexican serial killer
- Magdalena Sroczyńska, Polish pair skater
- Magdalena Środa (born 1957), Polish philosopher, professor, author
- Magdalena Stenbock (1649–1727), Politically active Swedish Noble (countess) and salon holder
- Magdalena Stoffels (died 2017), Teenage schoolgirl who was murdered
- Magdalena Streijffert (born 1977), Swedish politician
- Magdalena Lena Strothmann, (born 1952), German politician
- Magdalena of Sweden (1445–1495), Swedish princess, daughter of King Charles VIII of Sweden
- Magdalena Stysiak (born 2000), Polish volleyball player
- Magdalena Titrici, Romanian chemist
- Magdalena Tul (born 1980), Polish singer and composer
- Magdalena Tulli (born 1955), Polish novelist
- Magdalena of Valois (1443–1495), daughter of Charles VII of France and Marie of Anjou, and regent of Navarre
- Magdaléna Vášáryová (born 1948), Slovak actress and diplomat
- Magdalena Walach (born 1976), Polish film and theater actress
- Magdalene of Waldeck-Wildungen (1558–1599), daughter of Philip IV of Waldeck-Wildungen
- Magdalena Wójcik (born 1975), Polish singer and lead member of the Polish band Goya
- Magdalena Wolińska-Riedi (born 1979), Polish-Vatican journalist
- Magdalena Wilhelmine of Württemberg (1677–1742), margravine of Baden
- Magdalena Wunderlich (born 1952), German slalom canoeist
- Magdalena Zawadzka (born 1944), Polish stage and film actress
- Princess Magdalena Reuss of Köstritz (1920–2009), wife of Prince Hubertus of Prussia

== See also ==
- Anna Magdalena (given name)
- Magdalene (given name)
