= Mohammad Reza Madhi =

Iranian spy (died 2021)

Dr. Mohammad Reza Madhi (Persian: دکتر محمدرضا مدحی; died 8 August 2021) was (reportedly) an Iranian intelligence agent and the subject of a 2011 Iranian television documentary titled A Diamond for Deception (Persian: الماسی برای فریب). He has been described in the Iranian state media both as an agent who infiltrated the Iranian Green opposition movement, and as an actual supporter of the movement who was detained because of his activities.

== Overview ==
In January 2010, an article appeared in the Bangkok Post describing Madhi as a former officer in the Revolutionary Guards' intelligence service who "was forced to flee Iran in 2008 after being jailed for 73 years on what he described as "trivial" charges," and who had been "in regular contact with the opposition Green Path of Hope group" since he left Iran. The article, by one Maximilian Wechsler, quoted Madhi as saying that he supports Iranians' right to protest peacefully against the government, and that both President Mahmoud Ahmadinejad and Ayatollah Mohammad Taghi Mesbah Yazdi were "crazy." The article, however, was called into question. Laura Rozen, writing in Politico.com, could find no references to Madhi being a former Iran intelligence chief other than "those generated by the article itself;" and author Maximilian Wechsler, was "a former documented Czech-Australian double agent and informant." Another doubter, Golnaz Esfandiari of rferl.org, (writing after the release of the infiltration documentary) stated that RFE/RL's Persian service, Radio Farda, spoke with Madhi in early 2010 "but decided not to air any interviews because the editors felt Madhi was not credible and they were not able to verify his many claims."

A year later, Madhi appeared in a A Diamond for Deception, a documentary by Iranian state television aired just a few days before the second anniversary of 2009 protest over the disputed presidential election of President Ahmadinejad. The documentary describes Madhi as "a double agent" who infiltrated the Iranian opposition movement and foreign intelligence units, and succeeded in meeting US secretary of state Hillary Clinton, and US vice president Joe Biden, among other western officials. Madhi introduces himself to the opposition as "a diamond dealer" in the documentary, and approaches foreign governments under the guise of "a top official wanting to defect from the country's powerful Revolutionary Guard and claiming thousands of his colleagues were ready to join him." He also spends time in a military base in Israel working with the Israel's secret services. According to Madhi, Western countries have spent huge sums of money to keep the Iranian opposition alive, and former Iranian diplomat Mehrdad Khonsari, was involved in the efforts to create an Iranian government in exile.

These claims have also come under doubt. The "ultra-conservative" Iranian newspaper Kayhan published an article entitled "Confessions of an arrested member of the anti-revolutionaries," in which Madhi is the arrested member and his remarks are not exposes but confessions. The IRNA state news agency described the documentary prior to its broadcast as the confessions to authorities of a man deceived by the CIA.

According to the editor of the opposition Khodnevis website, Nikahang Kowsar, who had been in contact with Madhi:

"It is too soon to release the truth about Madhi. He might have acted as a double agent and it might be similar to the case of Shahram Amiri, the nuclear scientist who Iran claimed was their man, but some others said he returned to Iran after the government threatened his family in Iran.

According to the Tehran Bureau, documentary notwithstanding, there is no evidence either of a connection between Madhi and the Iranian Green Movement's leaders (Mir Hossein Mousavi and Mehdi Karroubi), or of any meetings between Madhi and U.S. officials.

== See also ==
- Islamic Revolutionary Guard Corps
- The Green Path of Hope
