= Magdalena Majewska =

Polish journalist (born 1963)

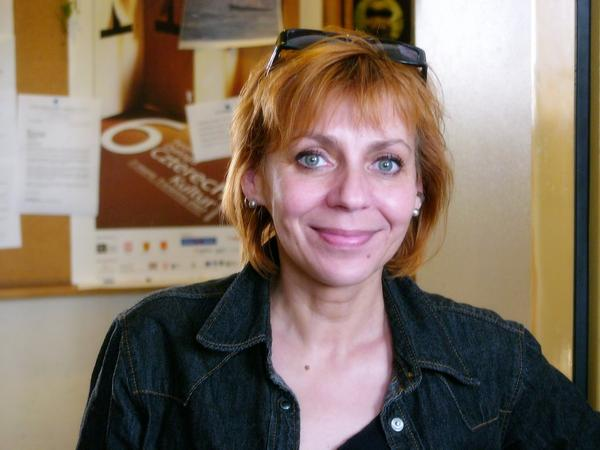
Magdalena Majewska

Magdalena Majewska (born 27 July 1963 in Pabianice) is a Polish journalist.

Since 1987 she works for TVP Łódź.
