= Maddyness UK =

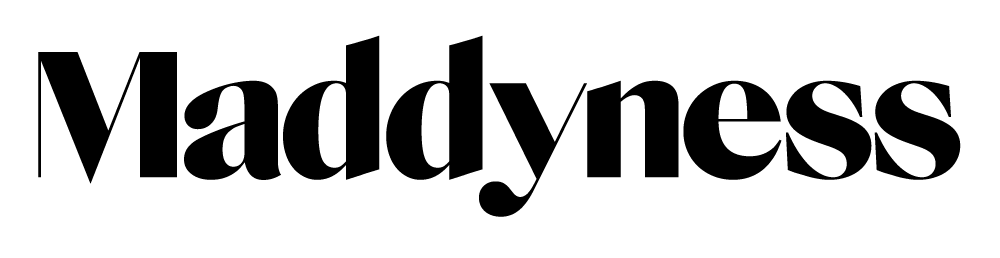
- Format: Online newspaper
- Owner(s): Louis Carle, Étienne Portais and Marc Menasé.
- Editor-in-chief: David Johnson (Maddyness UK)
- Founded: 2013; 13 years ago
- Language: English, French.
- Headquarters: Paris
- Website: www.maddyness.com/uk/

Maddyness UK (commonly Maddyness) is an online newspaper providing information on entrepreneurship, startups, and the economy related to this ecosystem, founded in 2013. It has been present in the United Kingdom since 2020.

== History ==
The media was co-founded in 2013 by Louis Carle and Étienne Portais.

In 2020, the media launched an English language version of its platform, overseen from the United Kingdom by David Johnson.

Investor Marc Menasé entered the ownership structure of the media in 2023. The objective is notably to "accelerate its development [...] internationally" with the opening of offices in Spain and Italy.

== Editorial line ==
=== Publications ===
Maddyness offers news articles, interviews, rankings, and opinion pieces targeting entrepreneurs, investment funds, decision-makers, and executives. The targeted readership is mostly between 25 and 45 years old.

As part of brand content production, the media has worked with clients including Orange and Google.

== Business model ==
The media's business model mainly relies on events (including the Maddy Keynote), advertising, and agency work including brand content and white-label content production. According to Les Echos, the company was profitable from its inception until 2019 before returning to profitability in 2021. Like other event organisers, the media suffered during the global pandemic in 2020 and 2021.

=== Ownership structure ===
In February 2023, Marc Menasé acquired 54% of the capital of the holding company for an undisclosed amount. The remaining shares belong to the two co-founders, Louis Carle and Étienne Portais.
