= Madeleine Herman de Blic =

Belgium-born Indian social worker and humanist

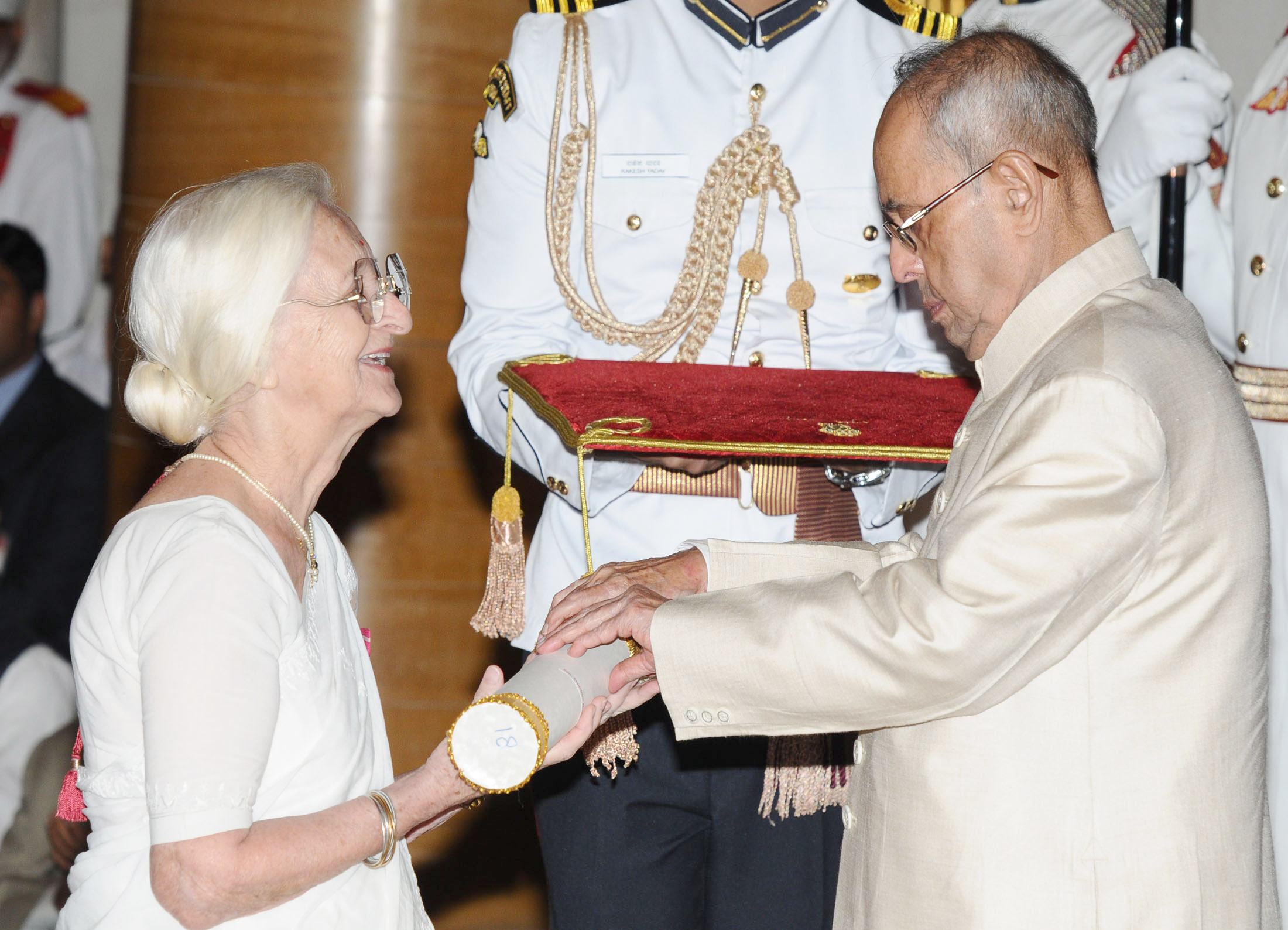
- Born: Madeleine Herman; 15 May 1934; Liège, Belgium
- Died: 14 March 2024 (aged 89); Toulouse, France
- Citizenship: Belgium (former); India
- Occupations: Social worker Humanist
- Years active: 1962–2024
- Known for: Social service Philanthropist
- Spouse: Arnaud De Blic
- Children: 4 (2 biological, 2 adopted)
- Awards: Padma Shri (2016); Legion of Honour (2013); Order of the Crown (Belgium) (2013); Doctor Schweitzer Award (1970); GoP Independence Day Award (2016)

Madeleine Herman de Blic (15 May 1934 – 14 March 2024) was a Belgian-born Indian social worker and humanist, known for her humanitarian services in the south Indian state of Puducherry. She is the founder of Volontariat, a Puducherry-based non governmental organization engaged in social welfare activities since 1966. She is a recipient of several honors such as Legion of Honour from the Government of France, Order of the Crown from the King of Belgium, Doctor Schweitzer Award and the Independence Day Award from the Government of Puducherry. The Government of India awarded her the fourth highest civilian honour of the Padma Shri, in 2016, for her contributions to society.

== Biography ==
De Blic, née Madeleine Herman, was born in Liège in Belgium and, after her marriage to Arnaud De Blic who was her classmate in the French School, she traveled to India in 1962, initially with an aim to do social service for one year. Her husband, who was doing military service as a teacher in connection with French Lycée, was stationed in Puducherry, a French colony during that time, and Madeline accompanied him to the coastal town where she worked at a maternity hospital run by the Sisters of St. Joseph of Cluny.

Her early activities included distribution of medicines to the needy patients by travelling on a bicycle which gave her the opportunity to witness the misery of the poor residents of the town and the nearby villages. Assisted by a few young people of the area, she started a small dispensary at Uppalam, a village near the hospital she worked, and also carried out milk distribution to the poor children. The efforts were streamlined under the aegis of a new organization, Volontariat, in 1966.

Madeleine and her husband had two children and later adopted two destitute children. She was based in Puducherry and was a naturalised Indian citizen.

She died at Toulouse in France where she was residing since 2020.

== Volontariat in India ==
Volontariat has grown over the years and expanded its activities into women and child welfare, healthcare, vocational training, education and agriculture. It has three bases in Puducherry, at Uppalam, Dubrayapet and Tuttipakkam, and manages several facilities. Selva Nilayam (Home of Abundance), a children's home with educational and residential facilities established in 1982 and Shakti Vihar (House of Strength) a nursery and kindergarten started in 1995 are based in Uppalam. This base also manages Amaidi Illam (Abode of Peace), a destitute home started in 2000. In Dubrayapet, the organization runs a small scale manufacturing facility for processing cotton, Shanti workshop, where 150 cured leprosy patients, both men and women, produce men's clothes, bags, aprons and tablecloths. The workers' children are provided with educational assistance such as uniform, school fees and food. The largest of their activities is at Tuttipakkam, where a large farm is being maintained.

Started in 1968 as a small farm with 9 acres of own land and 8 acres of land leased from the government, the project, popularly known as Tuttipakkam Agricultural Project, is now spread over a vast expanse and handles a variety of produces like rice, casuarina, groundnut, tapioca, banana, medicinal and ornamental plants, and has dairy and poultry farms attached to it. The annual production of the farm is reported to be 34 tons of rice, 7 tons bananas, around 18,000 coconuts, 143 kg of tapioca, 570 litres of milk, 4500 kg of live chicken, 475 kg of mangoes, besides casuarina, medicinal and ornamental plants. The facility also hosts children for summer camps and has a children's home, Soorya Centre, where 20 boys are accommodated. The activities are funded by agencies from France and Belgium.

== Awards and honors ==
Madeline de Blic received the first of her several national honors in May 2013, when the Government of France awarded her the Legion of Honour. A few months later, she was honored by the King of Belgium with the Officer of the Order of the Crown in September 2013. The Government of India included her in the Republic Day honors list, in 2016, for the civilian award of the Padma Shri. The same year, the Government of Puducherry awarded her the Independence Day Award, thus becoming reportedly the first woman to receive the honor. She is also a recipient of Doctor Schweitzer Award which she received in 1970.

== See also ==
- List of foreign recipients of the Légion d'Honneur
