= Tamaseu Leni Warren =

Samoan politician

Tamaseu Leni Warren is the former Controller and Chief Auditor of Samoa. He served until September 2010.
