= Madison (name) =

- Pronunciation: /ˈmædɪsən/

Origin
- Meaning: "son of Matthew" or "son of Maude"
- Region of origin: England

Other names
- Variant forms: Maddison, Madisson, Madisyn, Madyson, Madasin, Matheson, Mathieson, Mathison, Matthew, Madyson
- Pet names: Mad, Maddy, Maddie, Madi

Madison is a surname of English origin that has become a popular given name in the United States, and to a lesser extent in Canada. Madison, also spelled Maddison, is a variant of Mathieson, meaning son of Matthew. It may also have come from son of Maddy, Maddy being a diminutive of Maud.

Madison is also used as a given name. It has become popular for girls in recent decades. Its rise is generally attributed to the 1984 release of the film Splash. From an almost non-existent given name before 1985, Madison rose to being the second-most-popular name given to girls in the US in 2001. In 2024, the most recent year of available data, it was ranked forty-sixth. In 2022, it was the 41st most popular name given to girls in Canada.

As a masculine given name, Madison can be found within the top 1,000 names for boys in the United States up until about 1952. The name returned to the top 1,000 in 1987, remaining there through 1999, and it was the 858th-most-common name for boys in 2004, but it remains uncommon as a masculine given name.

== Surname ==
- Madison (surname)

== Given name ==
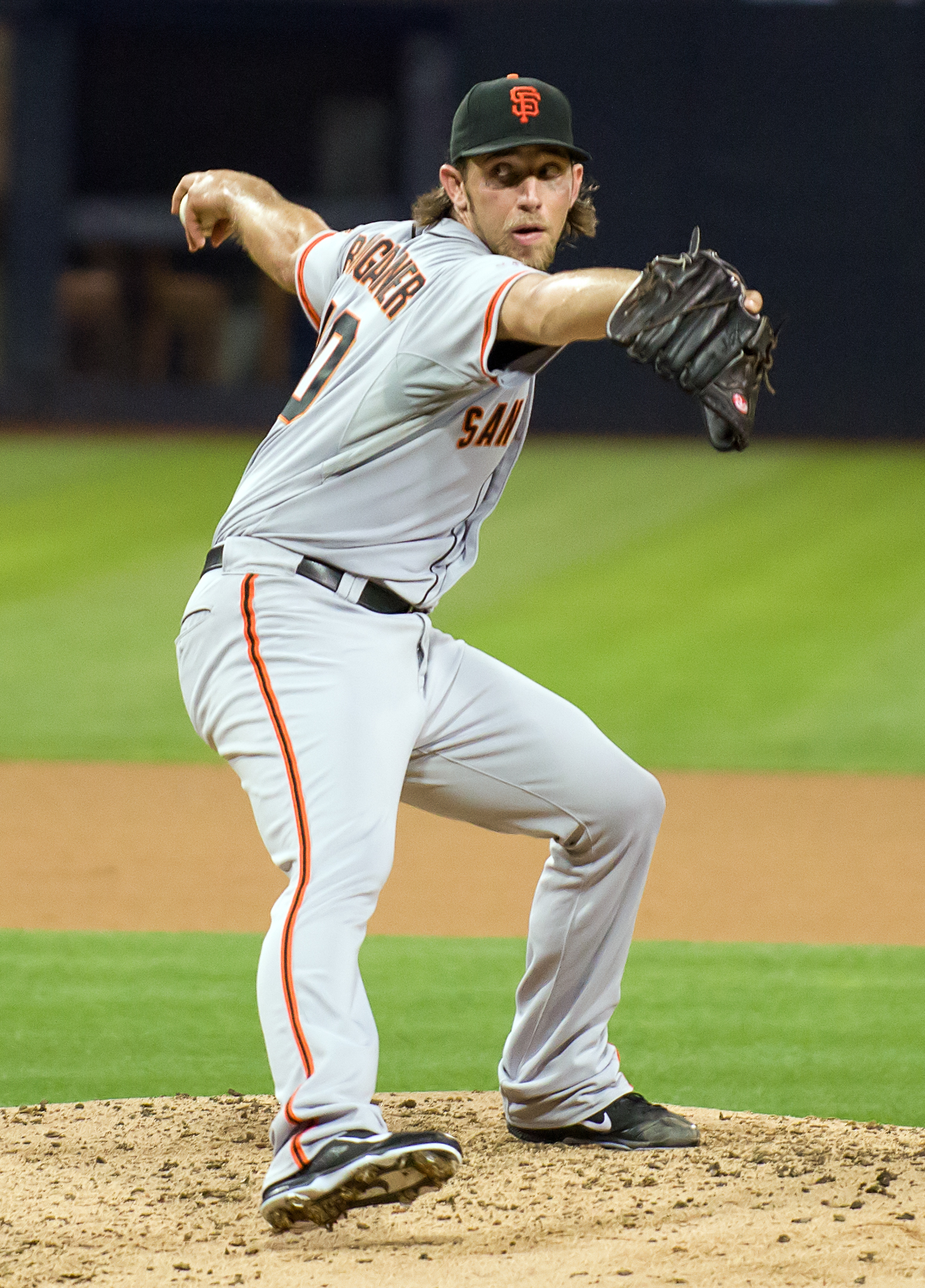
Major League Baseball player Madison Bumgarner pitching at Petco Park in 2013

=== Male ===
- Madison Smartt Bell (born 1957), novelist
- Madison Bolay, American politician
- Madison Bumgarner (born 1989), Major League Baseball pitcher
- Madison Cawthorn (born 1995), American politician
- Madison Cooper (1894–1956), American businessman
- Madison Grant (1865–1937), lawyer, eugenicist, and conservationist
- Madison Hedgecock (born 1981), American football player
- Madison Hemings (1805–1877), son of Thomas Jefferson's slave/mistress Sally Hemings
- Madison E. Hollister (1808–1896), justice of the Idaho Territorial supreme court
- Madison Hughes (born 1992), American rugby player
- Madison Jones (1925–2012), author
- Madison Marye (1925–2016), American politician
- Madison Nelson (1803–1870), justice of the Maryland Court of Appeals
- Madison S. Perry (1814–1865), fourth governor of Florida
- Madison Washington (circa 19th century), instigator of slave revolt
- Madison Whittle, American politician

==== Fictional male characters ====
- Madison Jeffries, comic book character in Alpha Flight

=== Female ===
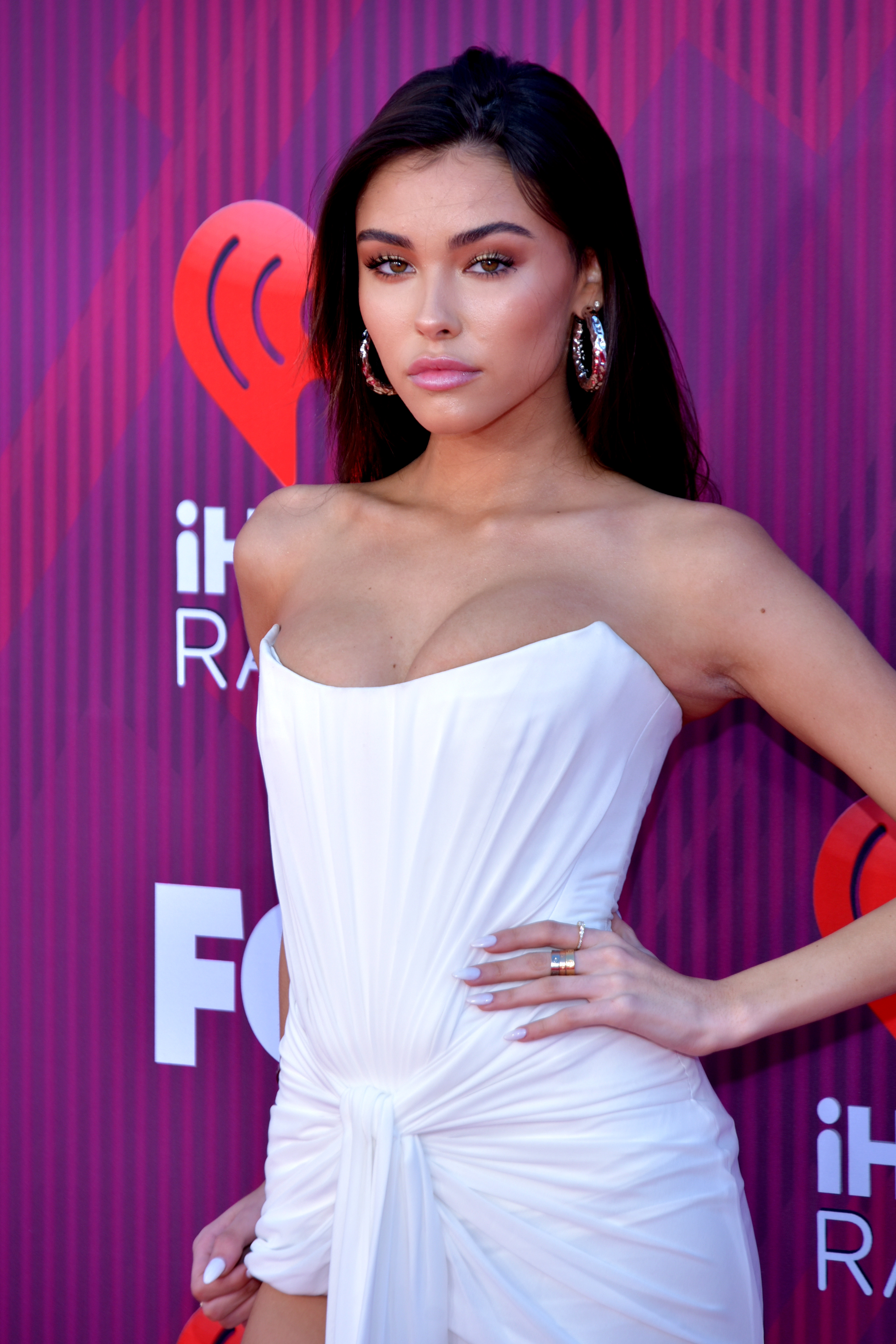
American singer Madison Beer, at the 2019 iHeartRadio Music Awards

Madison

- Madison Anderson (born 1995), American model and beauty pageant titleholder
- Madison Bailey (born 1999), American actress
- Madison Beer (born 1999), American singer
- Madison Bizal (born 2000), American ice hockey player
- Madison Boreman (born 1998), American steeplechaser
- Madison Booker (born 2005), American basketball player
- Madison Brengle (born 1990), American tennis player
- Madison Browne (born 1988), Australian international netball player
- Madison Chock (born 1992), American ice dancer
- Madison Conner (born 2003), American basketball player
- Madison Cunningham (born 1996), American singer, songwriter and guitarist
- Madison Davenport (born 1996), American actress and singer
- Madison De La Garza (born 2001), American actress and younger sister of Demi Lovato
- Madison Hu (born 2002), American actress
- Madison Hubbell (born 1991), American ice dancer
- Madison Humphrey, American TikToker and journalist
- Madison Iseman (born 1997), American actress
- Madison Keys (born 1995), American tennis player
- Madison Kocian (born 1997), American Olympic gymnast
- Madison Abigail Less (born 1998), American soccer player
- Madison Lilley (born 1999), American volleyball player
- Madison Lintz (born 1999), American actress
- Madison Marsh (born 2001), American air force officer and Miss America 2024 titleholder
- Madison McLaughlin (born 1995), American actress
- Madison McReynolds (born 1993), American actress
- Madison "Maddie" Mogen (died 2022), American murder victim
- J. Madison Wright Morris (1984–2006), American actress
- Madison Nguyen (born 1975), American politician
- Madison Nonoa, New Zealand-born soprano opera singer
- Madison Pettis (born 1998), American actress
- Madison Prespakis (born 2000), Australian Rules footballer
- Madison Rayne (born 1986), American professional wrestler
- Madison Scott (1991–2011), Canadian formerly missing person
- Madison Scott (born 2001), American basketball player
- Madison Shipman (born 1992), American former professional softball player
- Madison Thomas, Canadian film and television director
- Madison Young (born 1980), American pornographic actress, stage name
- Maddie Ziegler (born 2002), American dancer

Madisyn

- Madisyn Shipman (born 2002), American actress

Madyson

- Madyson Middleton (2006–2015), American murder victim

Maddison

- Maddison Brown (born 1997), Australian actress

==== Film ====
- Madison, the mermaid in the 1984 movie Splash
- Madison Morgan, antagonist of the 2015 film The DUFF
- Madison Russell, played by Millie Bobby Brown in Godzilla: King of the Monsters and its sequel Godzilla vs. Kong
- Madison Wolfsbottom, antagonist in Clifford's Really Big Movie

Television

- Madison, a character in This Is Us
- Madison, a character who appears in "Bully Exposed" in Care Bears: Welcome to Care-a-Lot
- Madison "Madi" Bader, a Season 2 contestant in Fetch! with Ruff Ruffman
- Madison Clark, main protagonist portrayed by Kim Dickens in Fear The Walking Dead
- Madison Duarte, cheerleader portrayed by Valery Ortiz in South of Nowhere
- Madison Fear, doll persona of Madison Beer in Monster High
- Madison James, businesswoman portrayed by Sarah Joy Brown in Days of Our Lives
- Madison Kellner, recurring character in the WB drama series Everwood
- Madison Maxwell, character played by Brenda Song in Dollface
- Madison McCarthy, cheerleader portrayed by Laura Dreyfuss on Glee
- Madison Montgomery, actress and witch portrayed by Emma Roberts in American Horror Story: Coven
- Madison "Maddie" Nears, protagonist in School Spirits
- Madison Robinson, a character in the Australian soap opera Neighbours
- Madison Rocca, the Blue Ranger in Power Rangers Mystic Force
- Madison "Maddie" Rooney, high school student and one of two main protagonists and title characters jointly portrayed by Dove Cameron in Liv and Maddie
- Madison Sinclair, student portrayed by Amanda Noret in Veronica Mars

Other

- Madison, from the Mattel doll line My Scene
- Madison Paige, photographer, journalist and protagonist primarily portrayed by Judi Breecher in Heavy Rain

== See also ==
- Maddison, a surname and given name
