= Maddy (surname) =

Maddy is a surname. Notable people with the surname include:

- Darren Maddy (born 1974), English cricketer
- Joseph E. Maddy (1891–1966), American music educator
- Kenneth L. Maddy (1934–2000), American politician
- Paul Maddy (born 1962), Welsh former footballer
- Penelope Maddy, Professor of Logic and Philosophy of Science and of Mathematics at the University of California, Irvine
- Yulisa Pat Amadu Maddy (1936-2014), Sierra Leonean actor, dancer, director and playwright
