= Mathieson =

Mathieson is a surname and may apply to the following:

- Alexander Mathieson & Sons, Scottish edge-tool makers
- Bonnie Mathieson (1945–2018), American scientist
- Colin Mathieson, Paralympic athlete from Canada
- Craig Mathieson (born 1971), Australian writer
- David Mathieson (born 1978), Scottish footballer
- James Mathieson (1905–1950), Scottish football goalkeeper
- Jamie Mathieson, British writer
- Jim Mathieson (footballer) (1892–1982), Australian rules footballer
- Jim Mathieson (ice hockey) (born 1970), Canadian ice hockey player
- Jim Mathieson (sculptor) (1931–2003), British sculptor
- John Mathieson (cinematographer) (born 1958), film maker
- John Mathieson (computer scientist), computer scientist who worked for Sinclair Research and later developed the Atari Jaguar video games console
- John Alexander Mathieson (1863–1947), Premier of the Canadian province of Prince Edward Island 1911–1917
- Kristi Mathieson, American politician from Maine
- Muir Mathieson (1911–1975), British conductor
- Neil Mathieson (1823– ), Scottish chemist and businessman
- Peter Mathieson (born 1959), British nephrologist
- Peter Mathieson, New Zealand swimmer
- Rhys Mathieson (born 1997), Australian rules footballer
- Scott Mathieson (born 1984), Canadian baseball player
- Taso Mathieson (1908–1991), Scottish racing driver
- Willie Mathieson, Scottish footballer

It is also very rarely used as a given name:

- Mathieson Jacoby (1869–1915), Australian politician
