= Mady =

Mady is a given name and a surname (rarely it may also be used as a nickname). It is considered to be a unisex name.

== Given name ==
=== Women ===
- Mady Berry (1887–1965), French stage and film actress
- Mady Christians (1892–1951), Austrian-born German actress
- Mady Correll (1907–1981), Canadian-American actress
- Mady Delvaux-Stehres (born 1950), Luxembourgian politician
- Mady Hornig (born 1957), American psychiatrist and associate professor of epidemiology
- Mady Mesplé (1931–2020), French opera singer
- Mady Rahl (1915–2009), German actress
- Mady Saks (1941–2006), Dutch film director and documentary filmmaker
- Mady Villiers (born 1998), English cricketer
- Mady Wechsler Segal, American sociologist

=== Men ===
- Mady Camara (born 1997), Guinean footballer
- Mady Sissoko (born 2000), Malian basketball player

== Surname ==
- Abou Elela Mady (born 1952), Egyptian engineer and politician
- Lamar Mady (born 1990), American football player
- Levente Mady (born 1959), Canadian swimmer

== See also ==
- Maddy (given name), a given name
- Maddy (surname)
- Unisex name
- Maddie
