= Madi Rural Municipality, Kaski =

Madi Rural Municipality मादी गाउँपालिका
- Gaunpalika
- Location in Nepal
- Coordinates: 28.255711°N 84.101028°E
- Country: Nepal
- Province: Gandaki
- District: Kaski District

Area
  - Total: 563 km^{2} (217 sq mi)

Population
  - Total: 18,153
  - Density: 32.2/km^{2} (83.5/sq mi)
- Time zone: UTC+5:45 (Nepal Time)
- Website: http://madimunkaski.gov.np/

Madi Rural Municipality (Nepali : मादी गाउँपालिका) is a Gaunpalika in Kaski District in Gandaki Province of Nepal. On 12 March 2017, the government of Nepal implemented a new local administrative structure, with the implementation of the new local administrative structure, VDSs have been replaced with municipal and Village Councils. Madi is one of these 753 local units.

== Demographics ==
At the time of the 2011 Nepal census, Madi Rural Municipality had a population of 18,153. Of these, 65.2% spoke Nepali, 31.6% Gurung, 1.6% Tamang, 0.9% Magar, 0.3% Bhujel, 0.1% Yolmo, 0.1% Newar, 0.1% Urdu and 0.2% other languages as their first language.

In terms of ethnicity/caste, 32.8% were Gurung, 24.6% Hill Brahmin, 11.5% Kami, 11.1% Chhetri, 7.1% Damai/Dholi, 5.1% Sarki, 1.8% Magar, 1.7% Tamang, 1.4% Gharti/Bhujel, 1.2% Thakuri, 0.6% Sanyasi/Dasnami, 0.5% Badi, 0.2% Newar, 0.1% Yolmo, 0.1% Musalman, 0.1% other Terai and 0.2% others.

In terms of religion, 73.7% were Hindu, 21.1% Buddhist, 0.7% Christian, 0.6% Bon, 0.1% Muslim and 3.8% others.

In terms of literacy, 67.0% could both read and write, 2.7% could only read and 30.2% could neither read nor write.
