= Maddison =

Maddison is both a surname and a feminine given name. It is a variant spelling of Madison. Notable people with the name include:

Surname:

- Maddison (surname)

Given name:

- Maddison Bird (born 1994), Canadian figure skater
- Maddison Elliott (born 1998), Australian Paralympic swimmer
- Maddison Gabriel (born 1994), Australian model
- Maddison Hall (born 1964), an Australian woman convicted of murder
- Maddison Pearman (born 1996), Canadian Olympic Speed Skater

== See also ==
- Madison (disambiguation)
