= Bascharage (commune) =

Former commune of Luxembourg

Coordinates: 49.56°N 5.89°E

Commune of Bascharage was a former commune in Luxembourg. Its main city was Bascharage with a population of 5387.

On 1 January 2012 the existing communes of Bascharage and Clemency with its main city Clemency with a population of 1832 were merged into one commune named Käerjeng. Clemency was assigned as the capital of the merged commune. The law creating the commune of Käerjeng was passed on 24 May 2011.

== Former commune ==
The former commune consisted of the villages:

- Bascharage
- Hautcharage
- Linger
