= Hautcharage =

Town in south-western Luxembourg

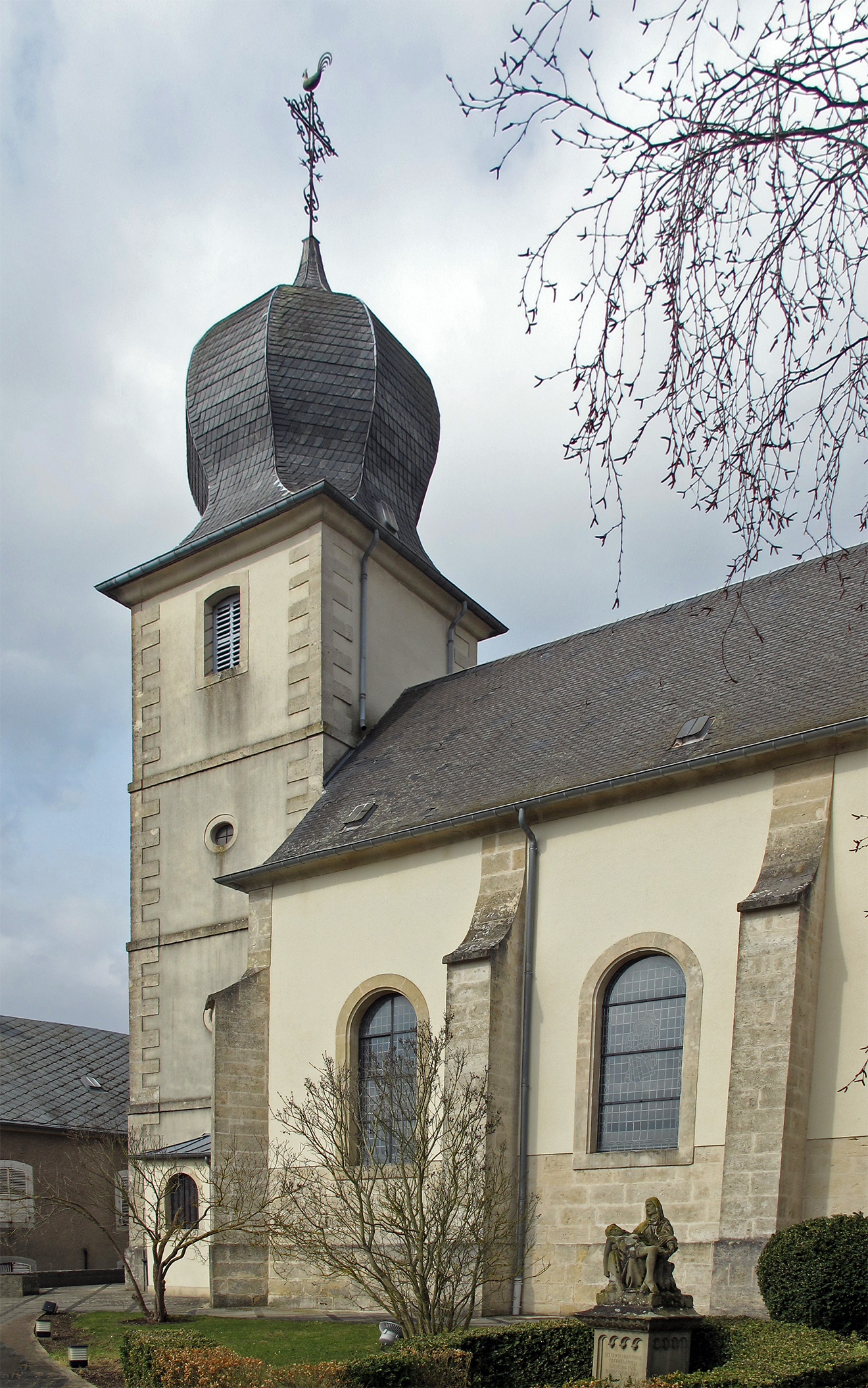
Church of St. Denis, Hautcharage

Hautcharage (French pronunciation: [oʃaʁaʒ]; Luxembourgish: Uewerkäerjeng [ˈuəvɐˌkɛːɐ̯ʒeŋ]; German: Oberkerschen [ˈoːbɐˌkɛʁʃn̩]; all lit. 'Upper Charage/Käerjeng/Kerschen', in contrast to "Lower Charage/Käerjeng/Kerschen") is a small town in the commune of Käerjeng, in south-western Luxembourg. As of 2026, it had a population of 2,014.

== Geography ==
Neighbouring towns include Clemency, Fingig, Hivange, Schouweiler, Bascharage and Linger.

The small river Mierbaach, which rises south of the Boufferdenger Muer, flows through Hautcharage.

== History ==
The church of St. Denis was built in 1744 and consecrated on 15 August 1761 by the auxiliary bishop of Trier Johann Nikolaus von Hontheim. Its furnishings are of Baroque style.

== Sport ==
Hautcharage's former football club FC Jeunesse Hautcharage won the 1970–71 Luxembourg Cup and qualified for the European Cup Winners' Cup. In the first round, Hautcharage drew the title holders Chelsea and lost 21–0 on aggregate, which remains a European record defeat. In 1997, the club merged with the neighbouring Union Sportive Bascharage, forming UN Käerjeng 97. UN Käerjeng 97 was based in Hautcharage until 2011, when it moved to a new stadium in Bascharage.

== Notable residents ==
- Henri Kellen (1927–1950), racing cyclist and participant in the 1948 Summer Olympics;
- Michel Wolter (born 1962), mayor and member of the Chamber of Deputies, former Minister of the Interior.
