= Bascharage (disambiguation) =

Bascharage (Luxembourgish: Nidderkäerjeng, German: Niederkerschen) is a town and a former commune in south-western Luxembourg.

It may also refer to:

- Bascharage (commune), a former commune in Luxembourg with its capital as Bascharage. Now commune merged with commune of Clemency to form the merged commune of Käerjeng
- Bascharage-Sanem railway station, railway station serving the towns of Bascharage and Sanem, in the south-west of Luxembourg
