= Beierhaascht =

Microbrewery in Luxembourg

Brasserie Béierhaascht
- Logo of Brasserie Béierhaascht
- Location: Bascharage, Luxembourg
- Opened: 2002
- Owner: Brasserie Béierhaascht
- Website: beierhaascht.lu

Brasserie Béierhaascht, is a Luxembourgish microbrewery/brewpub founded in Bascharage in 2002.

== History ==
The microbrewery Beierhaascht was founded 2002. In 2002 it started brewing its own beers and opened the restaurant and brewpub.

== Economy ==
As Brasserie Beierhaascht is only a microbrewery in Luxembourg, Beierhaascht beer does not make up much in Luxembourg's beer consumption. The large majority of the beer is sold in the brewpub itself, but the microbrewery is starting to expand on supermarkets and gas stations in southern Luxembourg as of 2016. At the moment, Brasserie Beierhaascht brew around 360 hectolitres all kind of beer merged.

== Beers ==
The following beers are sold under the Béierhaascht name:

Lager beer Hell: a very soft and full lager (5.1 %)

Dark beer: with a special hop taste (6.3%)

Ambrée: made of the same quantity of malt and hop (5.2%)

Wheat beer: very light and refreshing in the summertime (5.3%)

Winter beer: very balanced and aromatic in the wintertime (5.0%)

== See also ==
- Beer in Luxembourg
