= Clausel (beer) =

Luxembourgish beer brand

Letzebuerger Stad Brauerei
- Logo of Clausel
- Location: Luxembourg City
- Opened: 2007
- Owner: Letzebuerger Stadbrauerei
- Website: clausel.lu

Clausel is a Luxembourgish beer brand founded by microbrewery Letzebuerger Stad Brauerei in 2007.

== History ==
The microbrewery Letzebuerger Stad Brauerei (in standard Luxembourgish: Lëtzebuerger Stadbrauerei) was founded in 2007 in Luxembourg City. They brew their beer brand Clausel in the old Mousel brewery in the quarter of Clausen. The name Clausel is a contraction of Clausen and Mousel. As of 2016 Clausel is the only beer brewed in Luxembourg's capital city.

== Beers ==
The following beers are sold under the Clausel name:

- Clausel Classic (Pilsner)
- Clausel Gezwickelt (Unfiltered beer)
- Clausel Monk (First Abbaye beer in Luxembourg)
- Clausel Black Münster (Light pale Ale)

== See also ==
- Beer in Luxembourg
- Brasserie Nationale
- Brasserie de Luxembourg
