= Brasserie Battin =

Luxembourgish brewery

- Battin logo since 2004
- Location: Bascharage, Luxembourg
- Opened: 1937
- Key people: Charles Battin
- Owner: Brasserie Nationale
- Website: battin.lu

Brasserie Battin, is a Luxembourgish brewery founded by Charles Battin in 1937 in the city of Esch-Alzette. Brasserie Nationale has owned Battin since 2004, and since 2005, the beer brand Battin has been brewed in Bascharage.

== History ==
In 1937 Charles Battin founded Brasserie Battin in Esch-sur-Alzette to supply the important local market in southern Luxembourg, due to the steel industry. Although being the smallest and youngest of all luxembourgish breweries, Battin was quickly successful, also thanks to the talent of its first brewermaster, Kurt Mocker. Nicolas Origer, the husband of Charles Battin's daughter, took over the management from 1954 to 1962 before handing over to his own sons, Mark and Paul Origer. The latter then decided to expand the brewery: built next to the family home in Esch's city center near the railway station; this place had the advantage of being close to the arrival of raw materials but soon became too small to allow new installations who required more space. On the occasion of its 25th anniversary, the brewery acquired five additional floors but inside, everything was still done manually. The brewer was in direct contact with the raw materials and the brewing was still done by infusion into copper boilers, a practice which had already been completely abandoned elsewhere.

2004 : Takeover by Brasserie Nationale

In 2004, in time to take their pensions and to ensure a future for their family brewery, the Origer brothers agreed to sell Brasserie Battin to the largest luxembourgish brewery Brasserie Nationale. Since 2005 Brasserie Battin stopped brewing its beer in Esch-Alzette and completely moved its production site to Bascharage (where Brasserie Nationale already brewed its brand Bofferding), where its beer is currently still brewed.

== Economy ==
As of 2013, Battin is the third biggest Luxembourgish beer brand, making up 12% of beer consumption in Luxembourg.

== Beers ==
The following brands are sold under the Battin name:

- Battin Gambrinus (Pilsner), the main beer of Battin
- Battin Brune (Pilsner)
- Battin Pils (Pilsner)
- Battin Blanche (Witbier)
- Battin Extra (Pilsner)
- Battin Triple (strong Pilsner)
- Battin Fruité (with fruit additives)
- Battin Christmas (dark beer only distributed around Christmas)

== See also ==
- Beer in Luxembourg
- Brasserie de Luxembourg
- Brasserie Simon
