= Mousel =

Luxembourgish beer

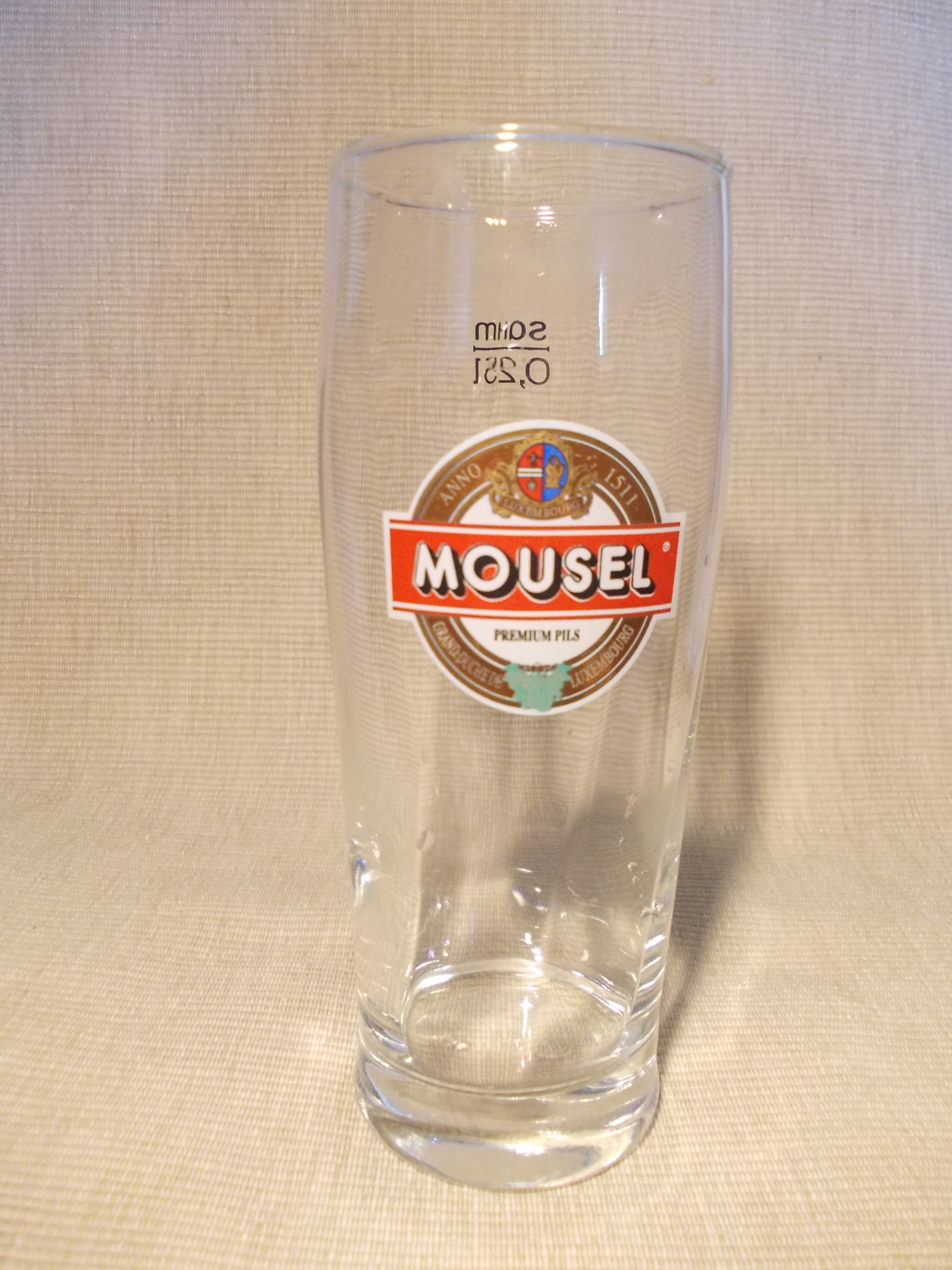

Mousel is a beer founded in 1511 in Luxembourg.

== Brief details ==
The Mousel brewery was located in the Luxembourg City district of Clausen, along the banks of the river Alzette, until 2000, when it merged with the Brasserie de Luxembourg and moved the production of Mousel to Diekirch. Mousel brews only one beer. The brewery's former restaurant, Mousel's Cantine, serves local cuisine as well as the beer Clausel, which has been brewed in the former Mousel brewery since 2007.

== Beers ==
As well as the Mousel brand the brewery produces Diekirch brands .

== Availability ==
Mousel is only available in 50 liter kegs, and the production will cease to exist. There is limited distribution in Europe.

== Future ==
The former brewery site has been developed into a gastronomic center including up-to-date bars, restaurants and beer places. This area, called "Rives de Clausen", opened in 2008.
