= Käerjeng =

- Commune
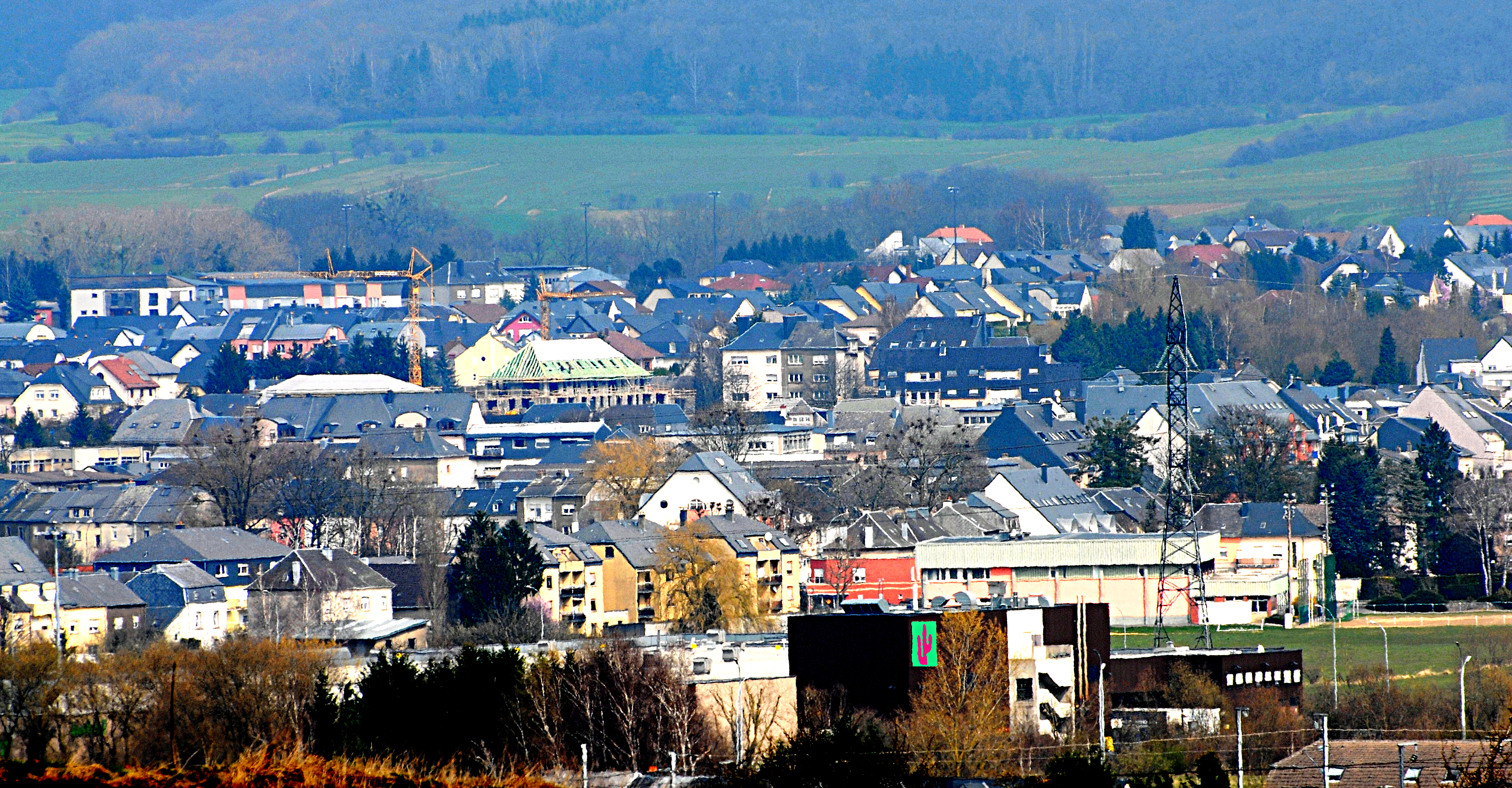
- Bascharage

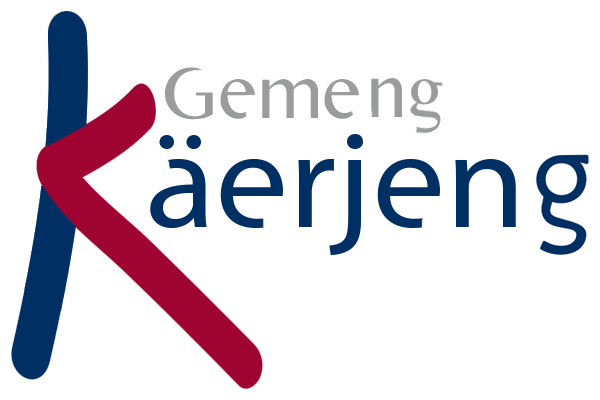
- Brandmark

- Map of Luxembourg with Käerjeng highlighted in orange, and the canton in dark red
- Coordinates: 49.5836°N 5.9°E
- Country: Luxembourg
- Canton: Capellen

Government
  - Mayor: Nadine Braconnier (CSV)

Area
  - Total: 33.67 km^{2} (13.00 sq mi)
  - Rank: 19th of 100
- Highest elevation: 395 m (1,296 ft)
  - Rank: 55th of 100
- Lowest elevation: 271 m (889 ft)
  - Rank: 73rd of 100

Population (2025)
  - Total: 11,589
  - Rank: 10th of 100
  - Density: 344.2/km^{2} (891.5/sq mi)
  - Rank: 25th of 100
- Time zone: UTC+1 (CET)
  - Summer (DST): UTC+2 (CEST)
- LAU 2: LU0000104
- Website: www.kaerjeng.lu

Käerjeng (Luxembourgish pronunciation: [ˈkɛːɐ̯ʒeŋ]) is a commune in southwestern Luxembourg, in the canton of Capellen. It lies on the border with Belgium. It has an area of 33.67 km^{2}.

The commune of Käerjeng was formed on 1 January 2012 from the former communes of Bascharage and Clemency. The law creating Käerjeng was passed on 24 May 2011.

With a population of approximately 11,000, Käerjeng is the 10th most-populous commune in Luxembourg.

== Geography ==
Käerjeng is located on the dividing line of the waters of the Rhine basin (Eisch) and the watershed of the Meuse (Chiers). It is bordered by the communes of Pétange, Differdange, Sanem, Dippach, Garnich and Steinfort, as well as the Belgian border to the north-west.

Elevation: Between 247 m (810 ft) at Tapp near Linger and 362 m (1,188 ft) at Kues near Fingig.

Total area: 52.2 km^{2} (20.15 sq mi)

=== Climate ===
Käerjeng has an oceanic climate (Köppen Cfb). The annual average temperature is 9.9 °C (49.8 °F), the hottest month in July is 18.7 °C (65.7 °F), and the coldest month is 1.8 °C (35.2 °F) in January. The annual precipitation is 944.2 millimetres (37.17 in), of which December is the wettest with 121.0 millimetres (4.76 in), while April is the driest with only 53.8 millimetres (2.12 in). The extreme temperature throughout the year ranged from −19.1 °C (−2.4 °F) on December 24, 2001 to 38.6 °C (101.5 °F) on July 25, 2019.

Climate data for Käerjeng (Clemency), 1991-2020 normals
Month	Jan	Feb	Mar	Apr	May	Jun	Jul	Aug	Sep	Oct	Nov	Dec	Year
Record high °C (°F)	14.4 (57.9)	21.5 (70.7)	21.8 (71.2)	24.2 (75.6)	32.2 (90.0)	34.7 (94.5)	38.6 (101.5)	37.8 (100.0)	34.3 (93.7)	26.7 (80.1)	19.0 (66.2)	15.4 (59.7)	38.6 (101.5)
Mean daily maximum °C (°F)	4.1 (39.4)	5.6 (42.1)	10.1 (50.2)	14.7 (58.5)	18.7 (65.7)	21.9 (71.4)	24.0 (75.2)	23.7 (74.7)	19.4 (66.9)	13.9 (57.0)	8.1 (46.6)	4.9 (40.8)	14.1 (57.4)
Daily mean °C (°F)	1.8 (35.2)	2.4 (36.3)	5.7 (42.3)	9.4 (48.9)	13.6 (56.5)	16.8 (62.2)	18.7 (65.7)	18.0 (64.4)	14.0 (57.2)	9.9 (49.8)	5.5 (41.9)	2.7 (36.9)	9.9 (49.8)
Mean daily minimum °C (°F)	−1.0 (30.2)	−1.0 (30.2)	1.2 (34.2)	3.4 (38.1)	7.4 (45.3)	10.6 (51.1)	12.3 (54.1)	11.9 (53.4)	8.7 (47.7)	6.0 (42.8)	2.7 (36.9)	0.1 (32.2)	5.2 (41.4)
Record low °C (°F)	−16.0 (3.2)	−16.6 (2.1)	−15.4 (4.3)	−7.2 (19.0)	−1.6 (29.1)	−1.3 (29.7)	0.0 (32.0)	0.0 (32.0)	0.3 (32.5)	−5.8 (21.6)	−13.1 (8.4)	−19.1 (−2.4)	−19.1 (−2.4)
Average precipitation mm (inches)	98.0 (3.86)	80.5 (3.17)	70.4 (2.77)	53.8 (2.12)	70.0 (2.76)	70.6 (2.78)	72.0 (2.83)	73.4 (2.89)	65.2 (2.57)	84.1 (3.31)	85.2 (3.35)	121.0 (4.76)	944.2 (37.17)
Average precipitation days (≥ 1.0 mm)	12.6	11.7	10.9	9.0	10.1	10.0	10.0	9.1	8.7	11.1	13.1	14.2	130.7
Source: NOAA

=== Populated places ===
The commune consists of the following villages:

Bascharage Section:

- Bascharage (seat)
- Hautcharage
- Linger

Clemency Section:

- Clemency
- Fingig
- Schockmillen (lieu-dit)
- Nuechtbann (lieu-dit)
- Neudrisch (lieu-dit)

== Population ==
Historical population

Year	Pop.	±%
1821	1,781	—
1851	2,517	+41.3%
1900	2,609	+3.7%
1910	2,714	+4.0%
1922	2,895	+6.7%
1935	3,376	+16.6%

Year	Pop.	±%
1947	3,267	−3.2%
1960	3,938	+20.5%
1970	5,225	+32.7%
1981	6,072	+16.2%
1990	6,544	+7.8%
2000	8,411	+28.5%

Year	Pop.	±%
2005	9,137	+8.6%
2010	9,474	+3.7%
2015	9,979	+5.3%
2020	10,464	+4.9%
2021	10,517	+0.5%

Source data

Town	Town (in Luxembourgish)	Town (in German)	Numbers	Former Commune
Bascharage	Nidderkäerjeng	Niederkerschen	5721	Bascharage
Clemency	Kënzeg	Küntzig	1996	Clemency
Fingig	Féngeg	Fingig	419	Clemency
Hautcharage	Uewerkäerjeng	Oberkerschen	1804	Bascharage
Linger	Lénger	Linger	601	Bascharage
15 October 2020

== Notable people ==
- Claus Cito (1882–1965), a Luxembourgish expressionist sculptor, known for the Gëlle Fra
- Franz Haupert (1907–1996), a Luxembourgish gymnast; competed at the 1936 Summer Olympics
- Paul Dahm (born 1951 in Bascharage), a Luxembourgish composer.
