= Beer in Luxembourg =

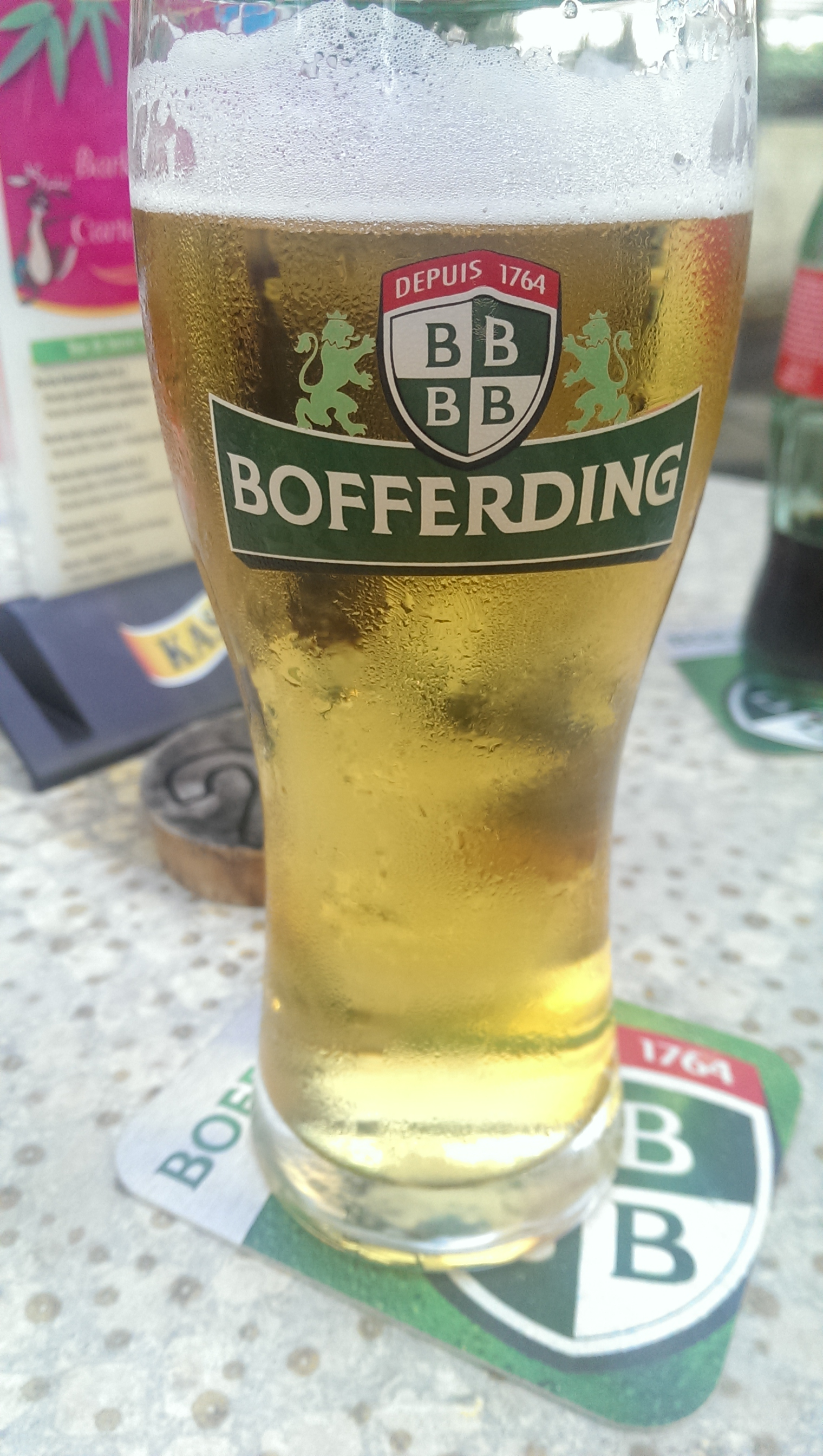
A glass of Bofferding

Luxembourg has a long tradition of beer brewing, dating back to at least 1300. Although there used to be more than 12 local breweries in Luxembourg in the early 1950s, this number has come down to only three big breweries remaining in the 2020s. The three big breweries still active today are: Brasserie Nationale in Bascharage, producing Bofferding and Battin, Brasserie de Luxembourg (owned by Anheuser-Busch InBev) in Diekirch, producing Diekirch and Mousel, and Brasserie Simon in Wiltz, producing Simon, Ourdaller and Okult.

Although there has been a resurgence of several minor breweries in Luxembourg during the early 2000s (mostly local microbreweries producing craft beer), the largest brewery remains Brasserie Nationale whose brands Bofferding and Battin together make up for 58% of Luxembourg's beer consumption as of 2013. The main beer in Luxembourg is lager, drunk in over 95% of the cases.

== History ==
The first beer brewery in Luxembourg was probably established around 1300 by monks in Neimënster Abbey, in the Grund district in Luxembourg City.

== Breweries and brands ==
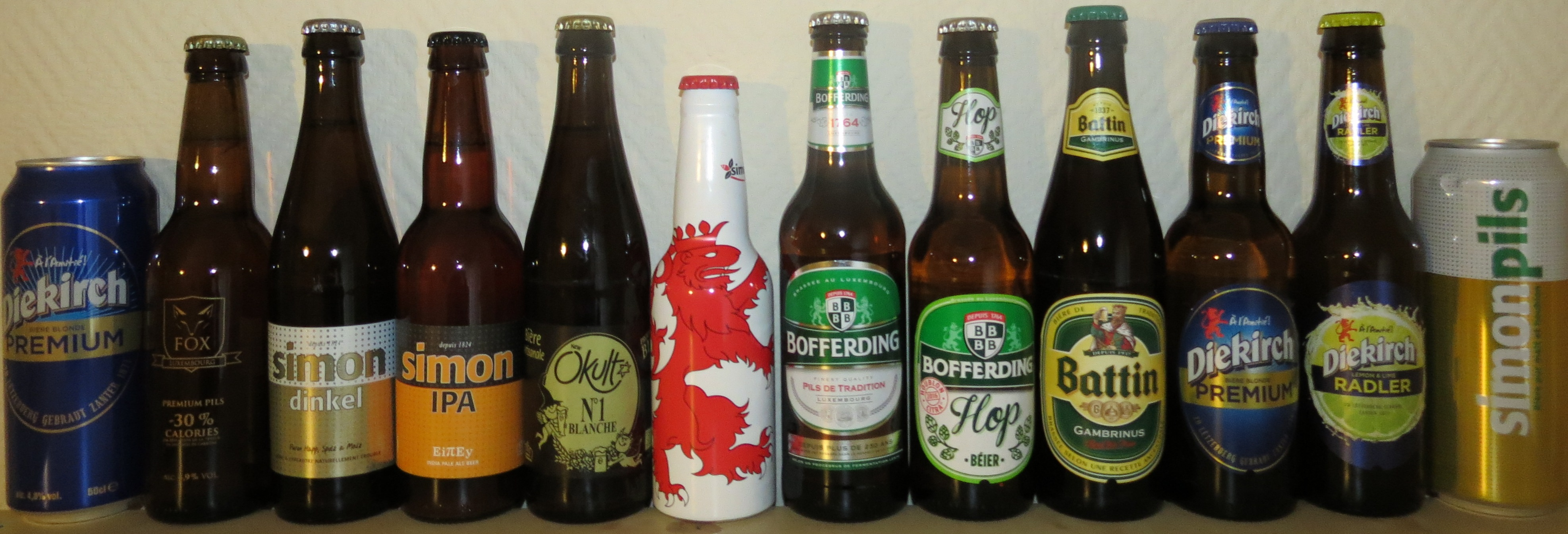
Some beer brands sold in Luxembourg in 2017

The 3 big breweries :

- Brasserie Nationale with its three brands Bofferding, Battin and Funck-Bricher
- Brasserie de Luxembourg with its two brands Diekirch and Mousel
- Brasserie Simon with its brands Simon, Ourdaller and Okult

Microbreweries/Brewpubs:

- Letzebuerger Stad Brauerei in Clausen, with its brand Clausel
- Echternacher Brauerei in Bech, offering classical beers e.g. Helles
- Brasserie Béierhaascht in Bascharage, brewing traditional beers.
- Den Heischter in Heiderscheid, brewing lagers.
- Totenhopfen Brauhaus offering a wide range of brews, from classic styles to hoppy and creative beers like Hot & Fancy (Smoked Gose with Cucumber & Piri-Piri) and Savage (Guava Lime Vanilla Imperial Pastry Sour). It also owns a shop/bar in Luxembourg city called The Store.
- Fox Beer in Bonnevoie, offering low calorie beers
- Bare Brewing in Differdange
- Grilo beer brewing classical beers
- Hinkelsbaacher Brauerei in Fouhren

== Defunct breweries and brands ==
- Brasserie de Dudelange (bought by Brasserie Funck-Bricher in 1964)
- Brasserie du Limpertsberg (founded in 1913 in the Limpertsberg district in Luxembourg City)
- Bierbrauerei zu Fels (from Larochette, defunct in 1866)
- Grand Brewing Luxembourg offering beers like Amber Ale (i.e. Red Bridge) & IPAs (e.g. Satellite IPA). Meanwhile closed
- Nowhere Brewing offering non-traditional beers like IPAs, Porters and Wheat Ales (e.g. Tropical Disease, Accidental Wheatness). Meanwhile disappeared
- Brauerei Stuff with its beers Revolution I.P.A., Grande Ducale, Knights in white satin and Black Widow. Meanwhile closed
- Bouneweger Brauerei from Bonnevoie. Meanwhile closed
