= Seed to Tree =

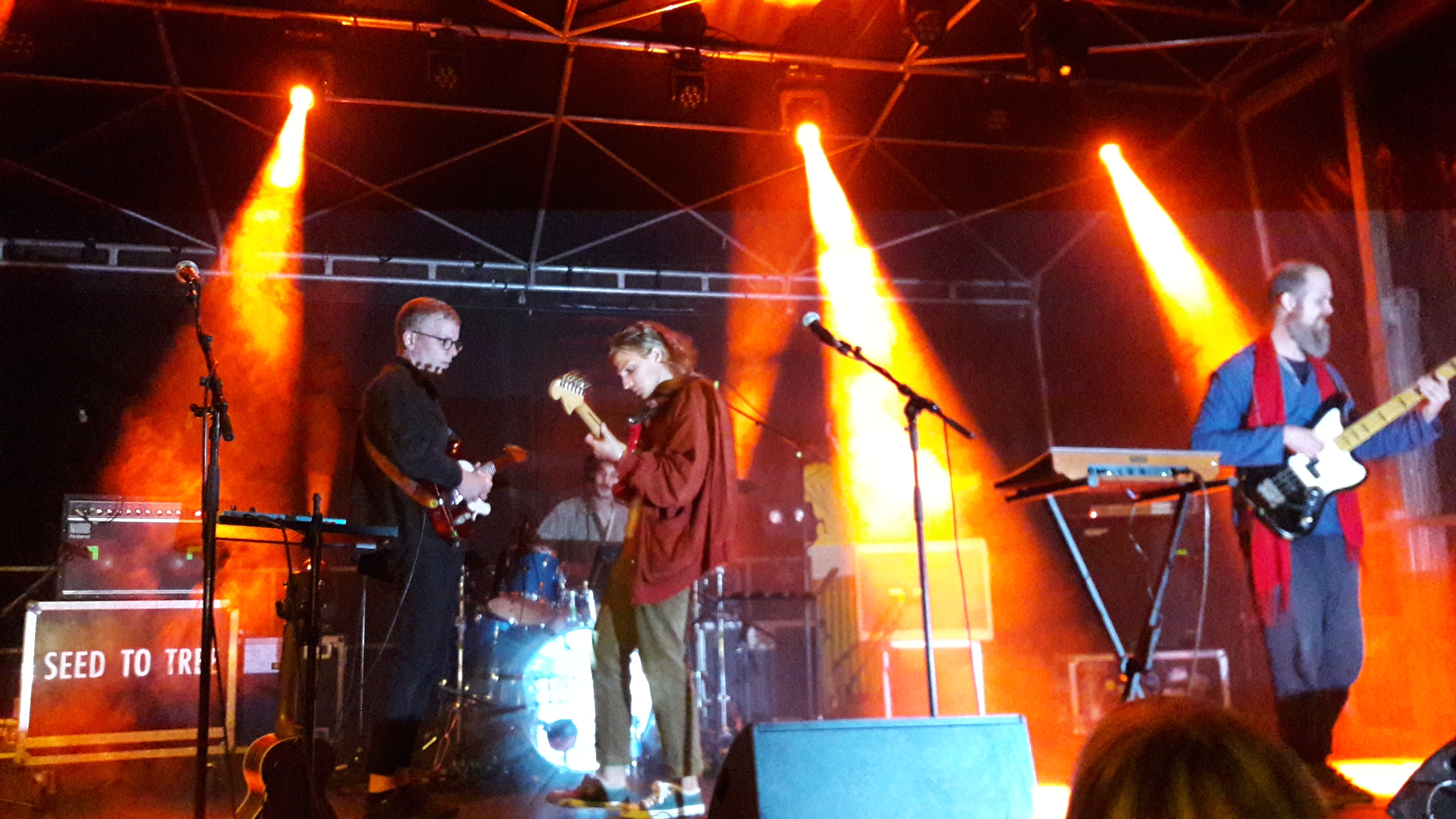
Seed to Tree in Leudelange (L), 2019

Seed to Tree are an indie band from Luxembourg, formed in 2009. The band consists of Georges Goerens (lead vocals, acoustic guitar), Benjamin Heidrich (electric guitar, backing vocals), Benjamin Renz (bass) and Michi Mentgen (drums).

Seed to Tree released their first EP "The Early Years" in September 2012. Their first single "Broken Down" spent 16 weeks in the Luxembourg national charts. After further music releases and slots at festivals both local and abroad, the band went on to release their debut album "Wandering" in March 2015. Previously in January that year the group signed with Believe Digital, an international online music distributor covering artist and label services.

== History ==
=== Early years (2009–2012) ===
Seed to Tree was founded by the two members Georges Goerens and Benjamin Heidrich in 2009 when they started playing guitar and singing together. In 2010, drummer Michi Mentgen joined the band. After going through a long list of names, the three of them settled on “Seed to Tree”, based on the track “Seed to a Tree” by Blind Melon. 2010 saw them starting to play local bars (becoming local resident of the Irish pub “The Pyg” in the Clausen part of Luxembourg City) and concerts in the Grand Duchy of Luxembourg.

Their first EP "The Early Years" was released September 2012. The band released their first single “Broken Down” that went on to spend 16 weeks in the Luxembourg national music charts. Frontman Georges Goerens describes their sound as a "mixture of rhythms and floatiness, with often clear and present acoustic guitars and dreamy keys and electric guitars." The EP was re-released in 2016 by Believe Digital.

=== Additional members and shows (2013–2015) ===
In 2013 two more members joined the band to complete its current formation. Keyboard player Jean-Marc Feltz and bassist Benjamin Renz. Renz, who was in fact the guitar teacher of Benjamin Heidrich, was asked by the band to come join them and play bass. Renz had never played bass before, but was up for the challenge. The quintet went on to play all major local festivals in 2013, including the main-stage of Rock-A-Field, the largest of its kind in Luxembourg. In 2013, the band was chosen as the Luxembourg band to participate in the Multipistes program. In 2014 the band opened up shows for Kodaline and Jacco Gardner and in 2015 for Juli, Villagers and Starsailor amongst others.

In 2015 the band toured parts of Belgium and Northern Germany with "Songs and Whispers". Later that year they performed at Reeperbahn Festival and the Sonic Visions Showcase. In March that year Seed to Tree played several concerts across Berlin.

=== Wandering (2015) ===
Closer to the end of 2014, the band announced they would be releasing their debut album "Wandering" in March 2015. It was recorded at La Chapelle Studios in Belgium. Their release show was at the Rockhal Club in Luxembourg.

As part of their album promotion, the band released ten short, 1-minute videos on Facebook of national radio presenters, musicians and celebrities capturing their first reaction to listening to one of the songs from the album. The attendance was high for a local band. This was mainly due to the wide range of marketing strategies of the band, especially on social media.

=== Until It Gets Better (2016) ===
On 6 February the band released the single “Until It Gets Better” accompanied with a music video directed by cinematographer Ben Andrews. ARA City Radio presenter Sam Steen described them as a “hard-working, talented and ambitious group of musicians” In an interview, the band said the aim was "not to have a video where we’re dancing around a tree and playing music” but to have a creative piece of work that used the imagination of the director, and where the concept and direction was little steered by the band members themselves.

Currently the band is playing festivals both locally and across Europe. They are also sometimes seen playing together with brass and string sections. As of 2016, booking agency Ton-e represents the band in the GSA region (Germany, Switzerland, Austria) and France.

== Band members ==
=== Band Members ===
- Georges Goerens (lead vocals, guitar, synthesizers)
- Benjamin Heidrich (electric guitar, backing vocals, synthesizers)
- Benjamin Renz (bass)
- Michi Mentgen (drums)

=== Past recording musicians and live musicians ===
- Jean-Marc Feltz (Piano and Synthesizers)
- Christophe Reitz (violin)
- Lisa Berg (cello)
- Romain Eiffes (trumpet)
- Tania Differding (trombone)
- Sandra Differding (trombone)
- Paul Klein (saxophone)

== Discography ==
- The Early Years EP (2012)

Track Listing:

1. Pine Cone (3:32)
2. Regrets (4:08)
3. Broken Down (3:37)
4. What Would You Do? (3:04)
5. Lonely Leader (4:24)
- Wandering (2015)

Track Listing:

1. Until It Gets Better (3:14)
2. Take My Hand (3:32)
3. Future Friends (3:35)
4. Lack Of Childhood (3:25)
5. I Was Here Before You (5:05)
6. Now Is Forever (3:29)
7. Wandering (5:18)
8. Both Sides (3:53)
9. Dancing Alone (3:17)
10. Tree (5:45)
- Proportions (2019)

Track Listing:

1. Apart (4:37)
2. I Wouldn't Mind (3:48)
3. Integrity (You Don't Owe Nothing To Me) (4:07)
4. Within Me (4:40)
5. Comfort Me (4:15)
6. Lack of Proportion (5:17)
7. Insecure (3:51)
8. I Don't See Myself (4:06)
9. All Night Long (3:27)
10. What Did You Mean By That (3:43)
