= Clausel =

Clausel may refer to:

== People ==
- Bertrand Clausel

== Other ==
- Clausel, a Luxembourgish beer brand founded in 2007
