= Paul Dahm =

Luxembourgish composer

Paul J. Dahm (born 30 December 1951 in Bascharage) is a Luxembourgish composer. He is best known for his arrangement of Mozart's three sonatas. Along with the American jazz pianist George Letellier, Dahm has also arranged the tunes of Frank Sinatra and the big band era and turned them into philharmonic ensembles with Opus 78.
