= Brasserie Nationale =

Brewery in Bascharage, Luxembourg

Brasserie Nationale de Luxembourg
- Logo of Bofferding, the main brand of Brasserie Nationale
- Location: Bascharage (Luxembourg)
- Opened: 1975 (fusion)
- Annual production volume: 165,000 hectolitres (141,000 US bbl)
- Owned by: Brasserie Nationale de Luxembourg
- Website: www.bofferding.lu

Brasserie Nationale is the largest brewery in Luxembourg, based in Bascharage. They also export to Belgium, France, China, and since 2014 to the United States. They brew beer under the brand name Bofferding and since taking over in 2004 Battin.

The Brasserie Nationale was born in 1975 from the fusion of two breweries: The Brasserie Bofferding, founded by Jean-Baptiste Bofferding in 1842, and the Brasserie Funck-Bricher founded in 1764.

== History ==
The Brasserie Nationale was founded in 1975 from the fusion of two breweries: The Brasserie Bofferding from Bascharage, and the Brasserie Funck-Bricher, located at the Grund district in Luxembourg City.

=== Brasserie Bofferding ===
Brasserie Bofferding was founded in 1842 in Bascharage (where the Brewery of Brasserie Nationale is still located today) by Jean-Baptiste Bofferding. The brewery continuously expanded in southern Luxembourg until finally merging with Brasserie Funck-Bricher in 1975.

=== Brasserie Funck-Bricher ===
Brasserie Funck-Bricher was founded in 1764 (hence the marked date on today's Bofferding bottles) and brewed in the Grund district in Luxembourg City. The brewery of Brasserie Funck-Bricher was located next to the Grund bridge over the river Alzette. In 1916 Brasserie Funck-Bricher was named fournisseur de la cour. In 1964 Brasserie Funck-Bricher successfully bought Brasserie de Dudelange.

=== Creating Brasserie Nationale ===
In 1975 Brasserie Bofferding and Brasserie Funck-Bricher merged. After the fusion of the two breweries was completed, the newly founded Brasserie Nationale closed the old brewery at Grund in Luxembourg-City and relocated its production completely to the Bofferding brewery in Bascharage. They also decided that all beer brewed from then on would be sold under the name Bofferding, thus the Funck-Bricher beer brand ceased to exist. In 2004 Brasserie Nationale bought Brasserie Battin from Esch-Alzette (which was founded in 1937) and transferred the production of Battin-beer also to its brewery in Bascharage where it is still brewed today.

== Economy ==
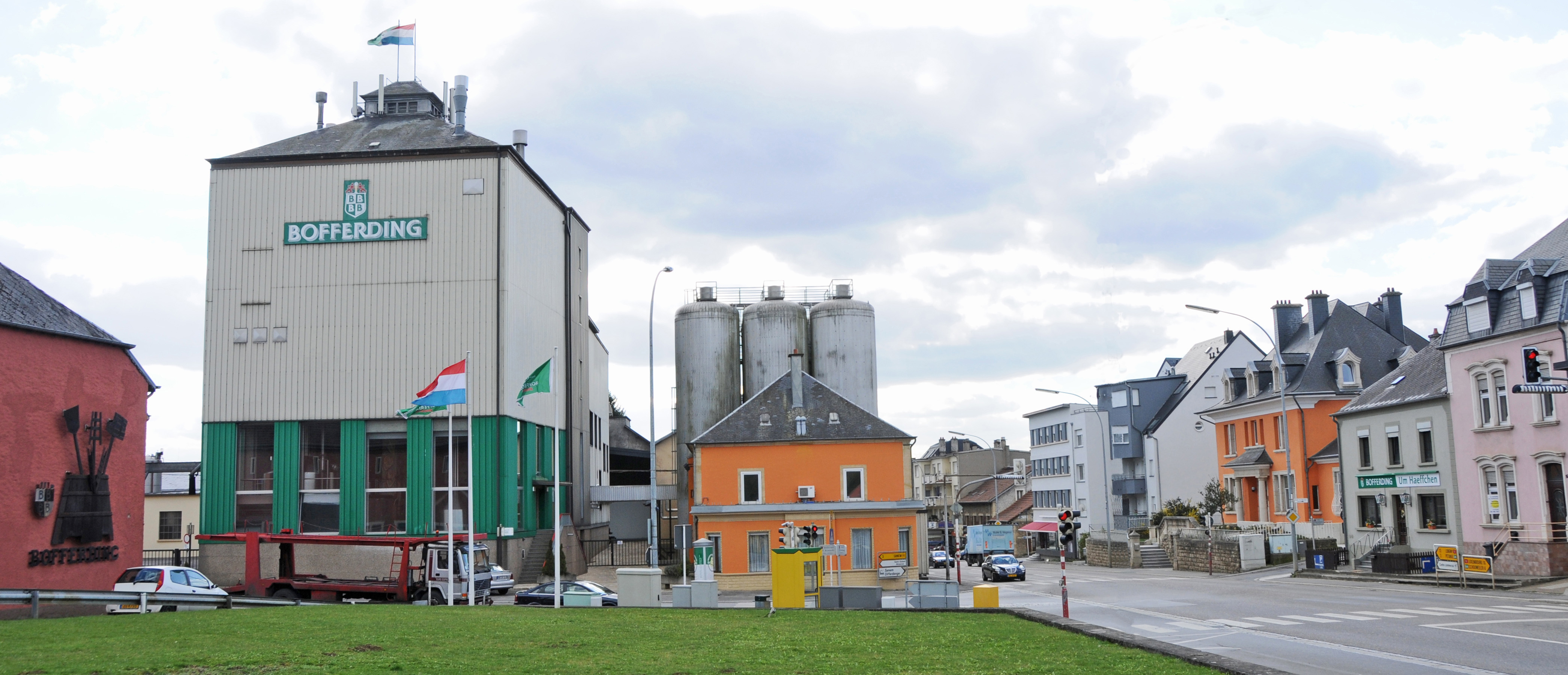
The brewery that produces Bofferding and Battin in Bascharage.

As of 2013 Brasserie Nationale with its beers Bofferding and Battin emerged as clear market leader in Luxembourg, with a share of 56 percent (Bofferding 44 percent and Battin 12 percent) in the sale of local brews – the equivalent of more than 32 million pints.
Around 20 percent of all beer brewed by Brasserie Nationale is exported to foreign countries: to France, Belgium, China (since 2007) and the United States (since 2014).

== Brands ==
The Brasserie Nationale is currently selling beer under two brand names: Bofferding and Battin.

=== Bofferding ===
The following brands are sold under the Bofferding name:

- Bofferding Pils
- Bofferding Christmas (darker beer, served only during winter)
- Bofferding Fréijoersbéier (unfiltered lager, brewed only during spring)

=== Battin ===
For the brands sold under the Battin name see :

== See also ==
- Beer in Luxembourg
- Brasserie de Luxembourg
- Brasserie Simon
