= Franz Haupert =

Luxembourgish gymnast (1907–1996)

- Born: 27 October 1907 Clemency, Luxembourg
- Died: 30 June 1996 (aged 88) Niederkorn, Luxembourg

Gymnastics career
- Discipline: Men's artistic gymnastics
- Country represented: Luxembourg

Franz Haupert (27 October 1907 – 30 June 1996) was a Luxembourgish gymnast. He competed in eight events at the 1936 Summer Olympics.
