= Clemency Castle =

Castle in Luxembourg

Coordinates: 49°35′53″N 5°52′27″E

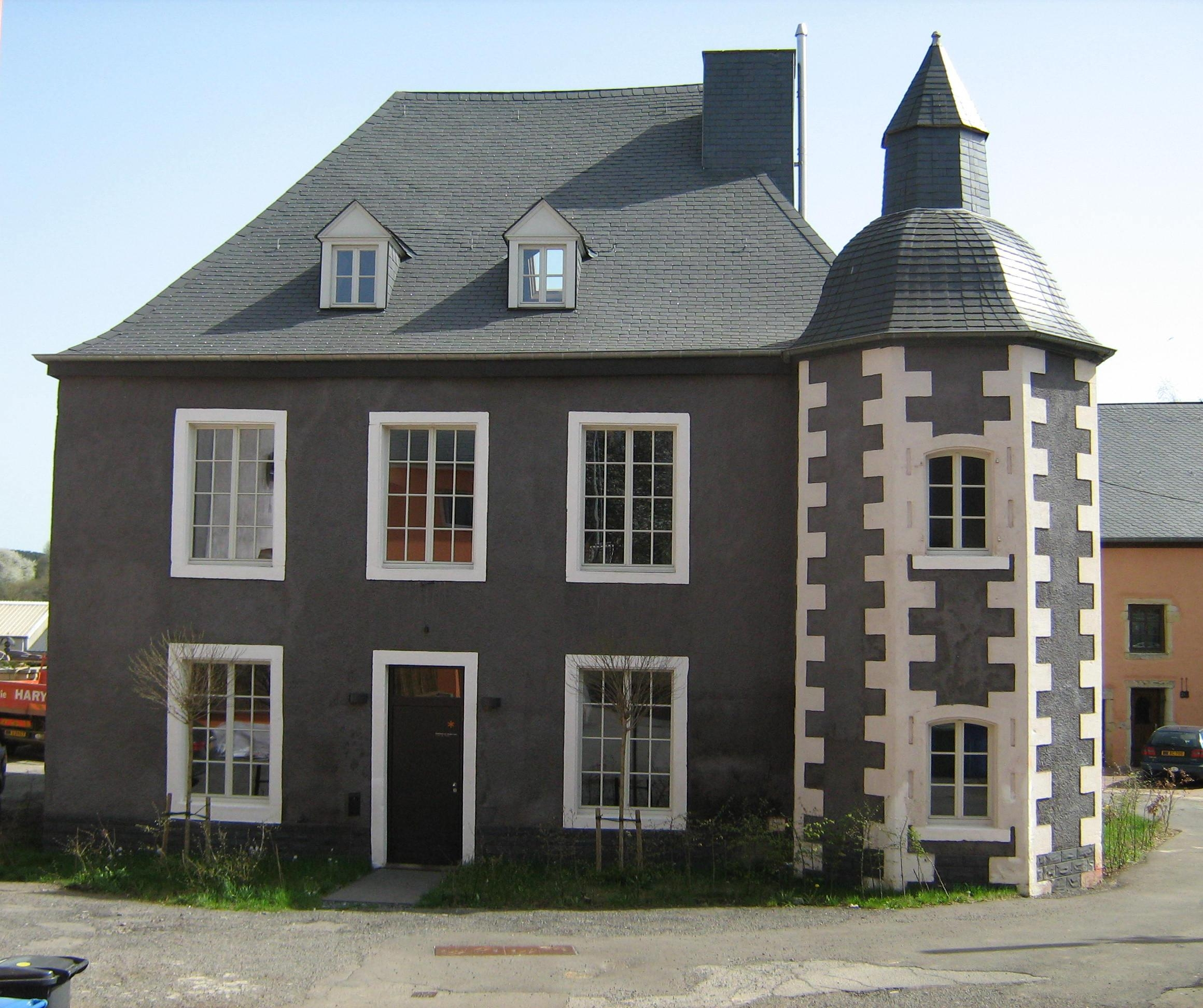
Clemency Castle

Clemency Castle (French: Château de Clemency, German: Schloss Küntzig Luxembourgish: Schlass Kënzeg) is located in the little town of Clemency which is close to the Belgian border in south-eastern Luxembourg. The small residential castle adjacent to the church was built in the 1660s in the Renaissance style. It had fallen into disrepair but was fully renovated in 2009 and is occasionally open to the public.

== History ==
The castle was built in 1665 by Johann Ferdinand von Blanchard, a sire of Clemency. For building materials, he used the ruins of an earlier castle which stood on a site some 30 metres away from today's castle. Fifty years later, it was transformed into the Baroque style of the times. In 1721, after von Lanser had bought the property, it once again underwent transformations. In 1982, Jean Weis acquired the property which was inhabited until 2004.

== See also ==
- List of castles in Luxembourg
