= Hivange =

Village in Luxembourg

Coordinates: 49°36′N 5°56′E

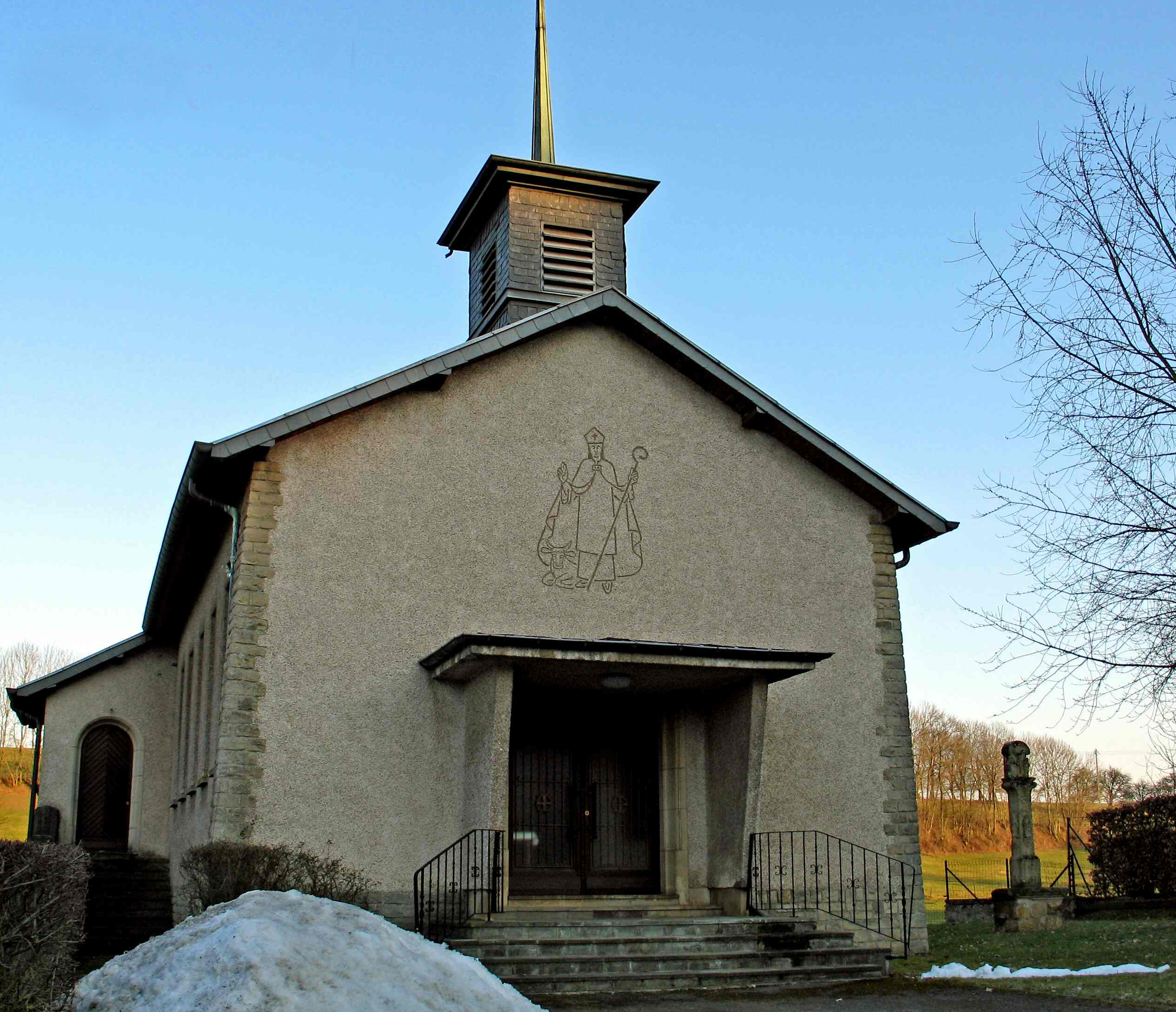
Chapel in Hivange

Hivange (French pronunciation: [ivɑ̃ʒ]; Luxembourgish: Héiweng; German: Hivingen [ˈhiːvɪŋən]) is a village in the commune of Garnich, in western Luxembourg. As of September 2026, the village has a population of 140. Nearby is the source of the Mamer.
