= Garnich =

Garnich Garnech (Luxembourgish)
- Commune
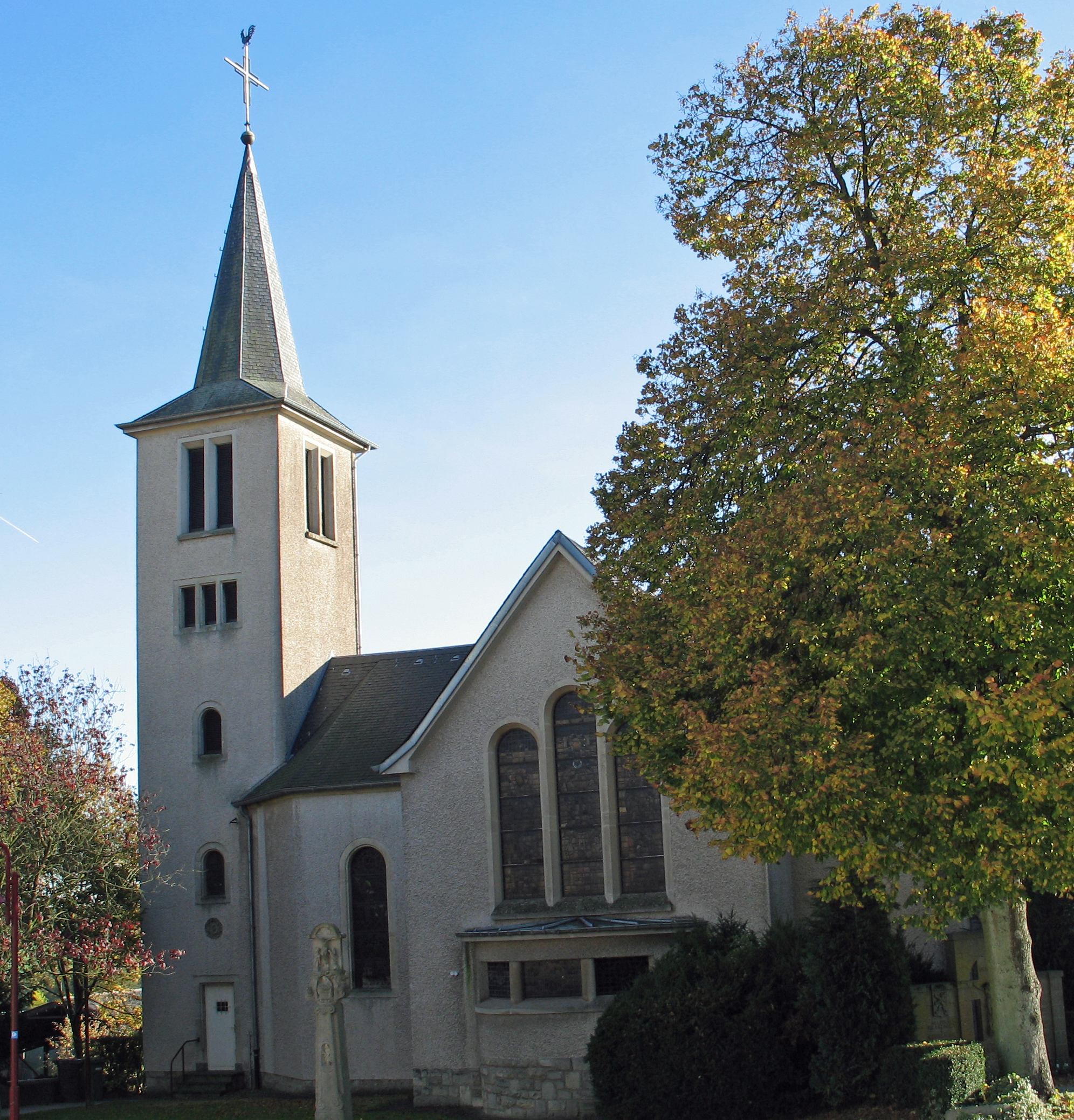
- Garnich church

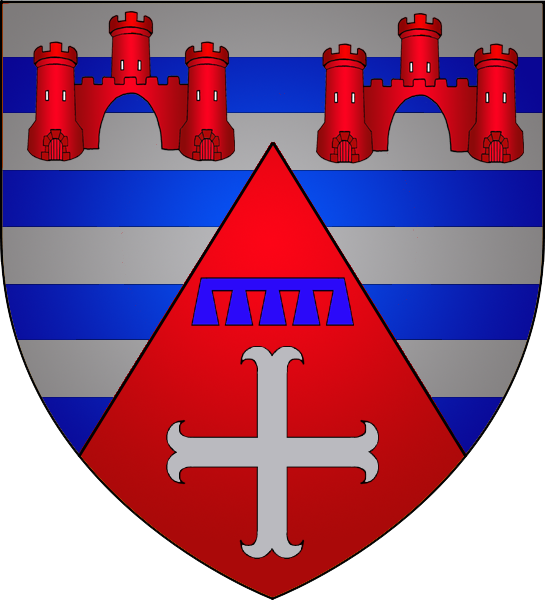
- Coat of arms

- Map of Luxembourg with Garnich highlighted in orange, and the canton in dark red
- Coordinates: 49.615°N 5.9506°E
- Country: Luxembourg
- Canton: Capellen

Government
  - Mayor: Sonia Fischer-Fantini

Area
  - Total: 20.95 km^{2} (8.09 sq mi)
  - Rank: 52nd of 100
- Highest elevation: 398 m (1,306 ft)
  - Rank: 52nd of 100
- Lowest elevation: 306 m (1,004 ft)
  - Rank: 96th of 100

Population (2025)
  - Total: 2,311
  - Rank: 70th of 100
  - Density: 110.3/km^{2} (285.7/sq mi)
  - Rank: 64th of 100
- Time zone: UTC+1 (CET)
  - Summer (DST): UTC+2 (CEST)
- LAU 2: LU0000102
- Website: garnich.lu

Garnich (German pronunciation: [ˈɡaʁnɪç]; Luxembourgish: Garnech) is a commune and small town in southwestern Luxembourg. It is part of the canton of Capellen.

As of September 2026, the town of Garnich, which lies in the east of the commune, has a population of 1,440. Other towns within the commune include Dahlem, Hivange, and Kahler. The commune as a whole has a population of 2,289 as of 2023.

== Population ==
Historical population

Year	Pop.	±%
1821	666	—
1851	987	+48.2%
1900	1,026	+4.0%
1910	1,032	+0.6%
1922	937	−9.2%
1935	962	+2.7%

Year	Pop.	±%
1947	920	−4.4%
1960	888	−3.5%
1970	980	+10.4%
1981	1,111	+13.4%
1990	1,271	+14.4%
2000	1,504	+18.3%

Year	Pop.	±%
2005	1,537	+2.2%
2010	1,771	+15.2%
2015	1,991	+12.4%
2020	2,193	+10.1%
2021	2,221	+1.3%

Source data

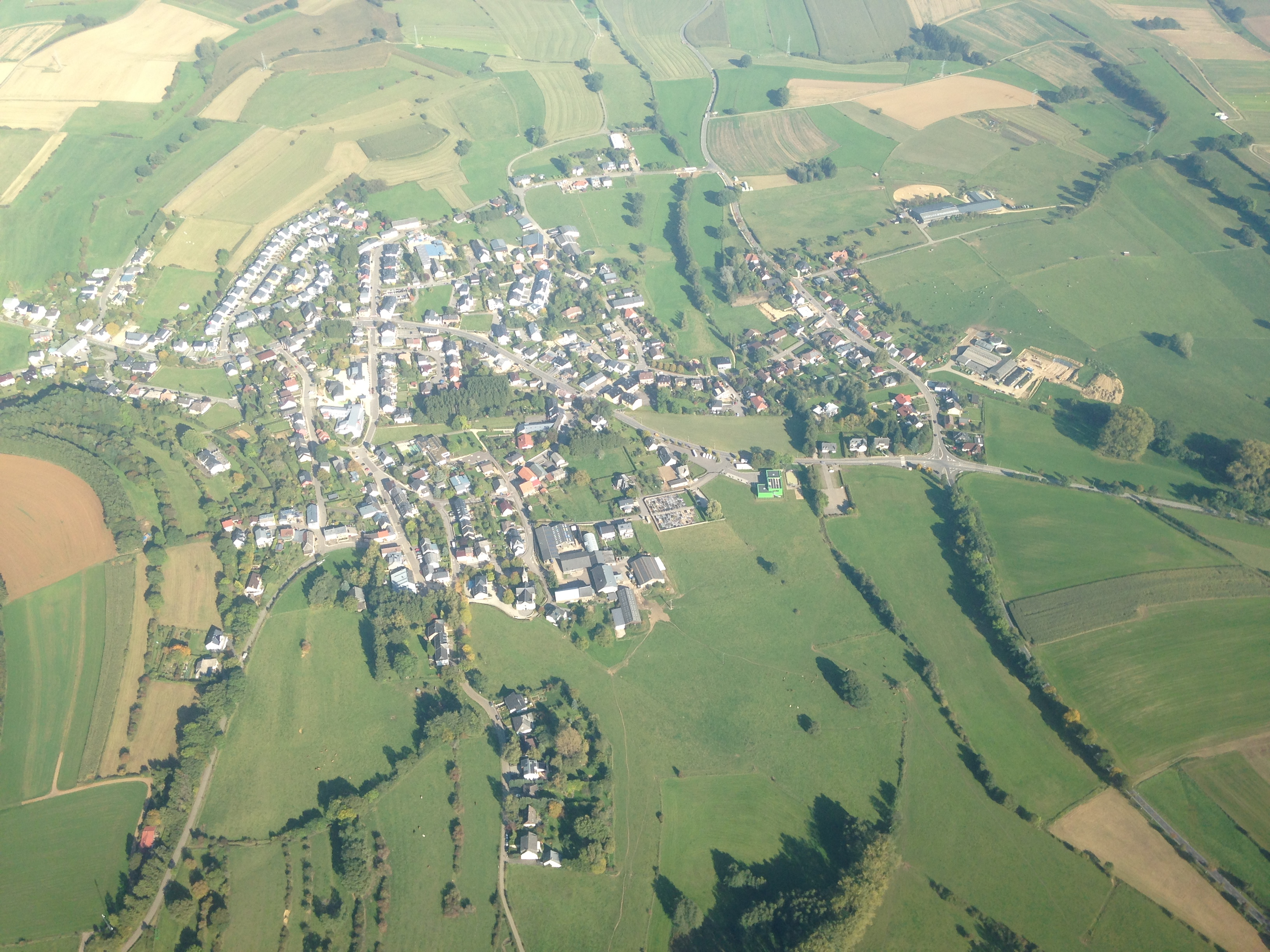
Aerial view of Garnich (Garnech)

== List of mayors ==
Name	Start	End
Charles Metzler	1803	1817
Nicolas Metzler	1817	1836
Peter Metzler (first time)	1836	1858
Jean-Nicolas Arend	1858	1861
Peter Metzler (second time)	1861	1872
Johann Müller	1873	1879
Jacques Schmitz	1879	1922
Henri Franck I	1922	1924
Edmond Kerschen	1925	1945
Nic Arend	1946	1963
Félix Jemming	1964	1981
Eugène Dondelinger	1982	1993
Henri Franck II	1994	2011
Georges Fohl	2011	2023
Sonia Fischer-Fantini	2023	present
