= Clemency, Luxembourg =

Clemency Kënzeg
- Former commune
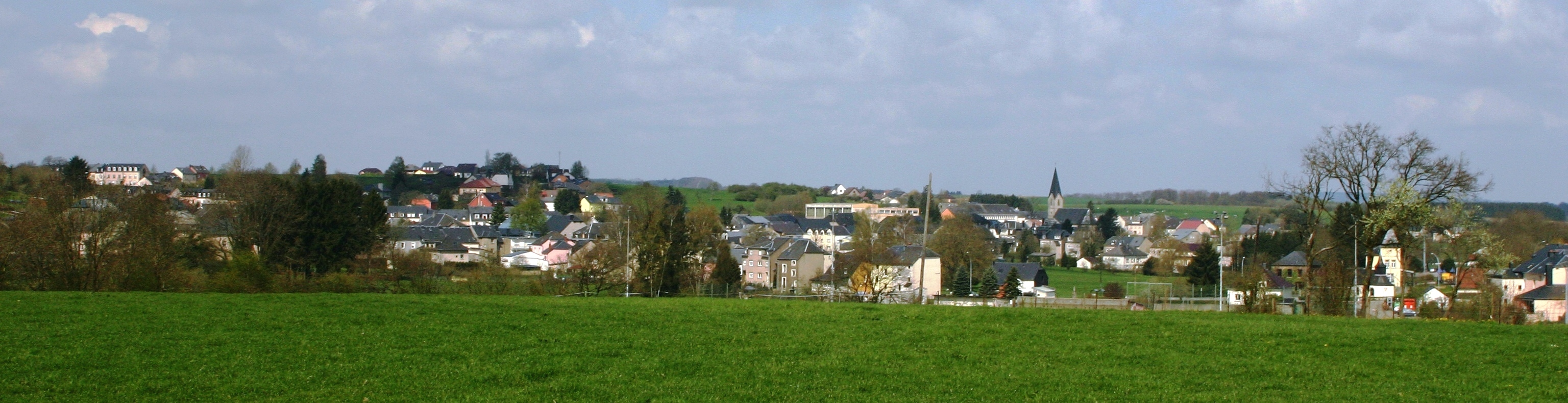
- Eastern view

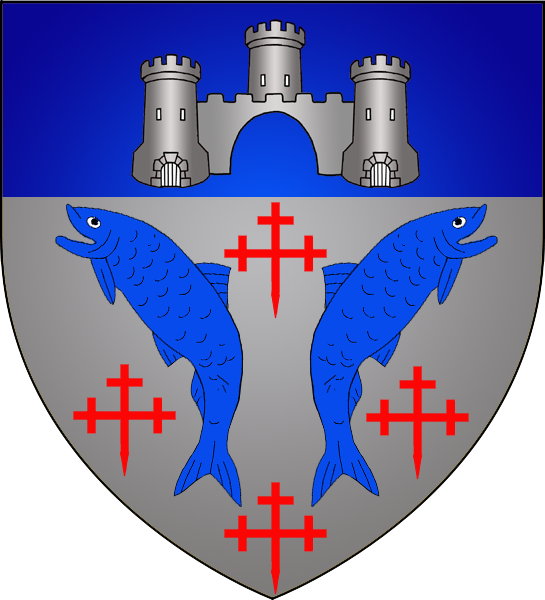
- Coat of arms

- Map of Luxembourg with Clemency highlighted in orange, and the canton in dark red
- Coordinates: 49.5958°N 5.875°E
- Country: Luxembourg
- Canton: Capellen
- Commune: Käerjeng
- Time zone: UTC+1 (CET)
  - Summer (DST): UTC+2 (CEST)
- Website: clemency.lu

Clemency (Note: French pronunciation: [klemɑ̃si]; Luxembourgish: Kënzeg; German: Küntzig [ˈkʏntsɪç]) is a town in the canton of Capellen, in south-western Luxembourg. It was the centre of the commune of the same name until 2012, when it merged with Bascharage to form the new commune of Käerjeng.

As of September 2026, the town has a population of 2,040. Clemency is a rural community close to the Belgian border.

== Geography ==
The town is located near the Belgian border, at the source of the River Eisch. Clemency, situated on the junction of the CR 101 and the CR 110 is 21 kilometres (13 mi) west of Luxembourg. It is 5 km from the E25 motorway to Luxembourg and Brussels. The area is partly forested but mostly agricultural with mixed farming. There are fishing ponds between Clemency and Fingig as well as a marshy nature reserve, the Neidriesch, where there is a colony of crested newts, a protected species.

== History ==
=== Celtic tomb ===
The history of Clemency goes back to the 1st century BC when the Treveri, a Celtic tribe, inhabited the region around Titelberg, a large oppidum near Rodange. A Celtic funeral chamber measuring 4.30 by 4.20 metres (14.1 by 13.8 ft), the largest Gallic tomb ever found, was discovered in 1987 at Clemency. From the offerings in the tomb, it was obviously the burial place of a Celtic nobleman. These included at least ten wine amphorae, an Italic bronze basin, an oil lamp from Campania, an iron grill and some 30 Gallic pots. There was also a chimney from an iron smelter in the chamber testifying to the deceased's association with iron production.

=== An ancient parish ===
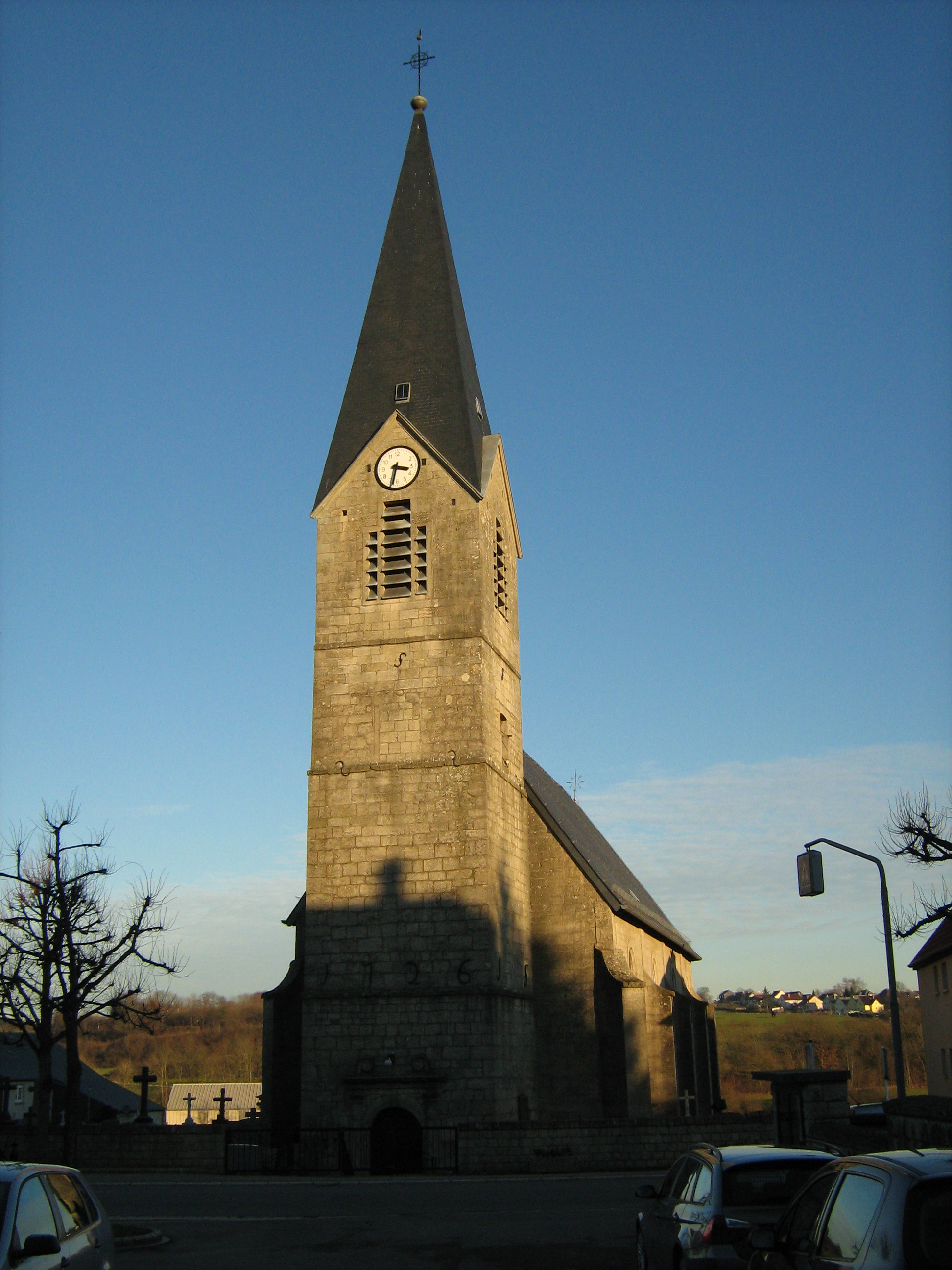
Clemency church

Although today's high-steepled church was built in 1726, records indicate that the community and its parish are far older. Information from the Pétange tourist office explains how Charles Martel offered Clemency and Pétange to St. Maximin's Abbey, Trier, in 723. A document dated 1140 reports that Pétange belonged to the parish of Clemency. This apparently continued to be the case for several hundred years.

=== The old railway ===
In 1873, the Prince Henri railway was opened. It took passengers and goods from Pétange to Steinfort via Clemency. After it was extended in 1880 to run as far as Ettelbruck, a total distance of 52 kilometres (32 mi), it became known as the Attert Line. The railway, which operated until 1967, mainly for transporting iron ore and coke for the mining operations in the region. Today the old line has been converted into a cycle track.

== Commune status ==
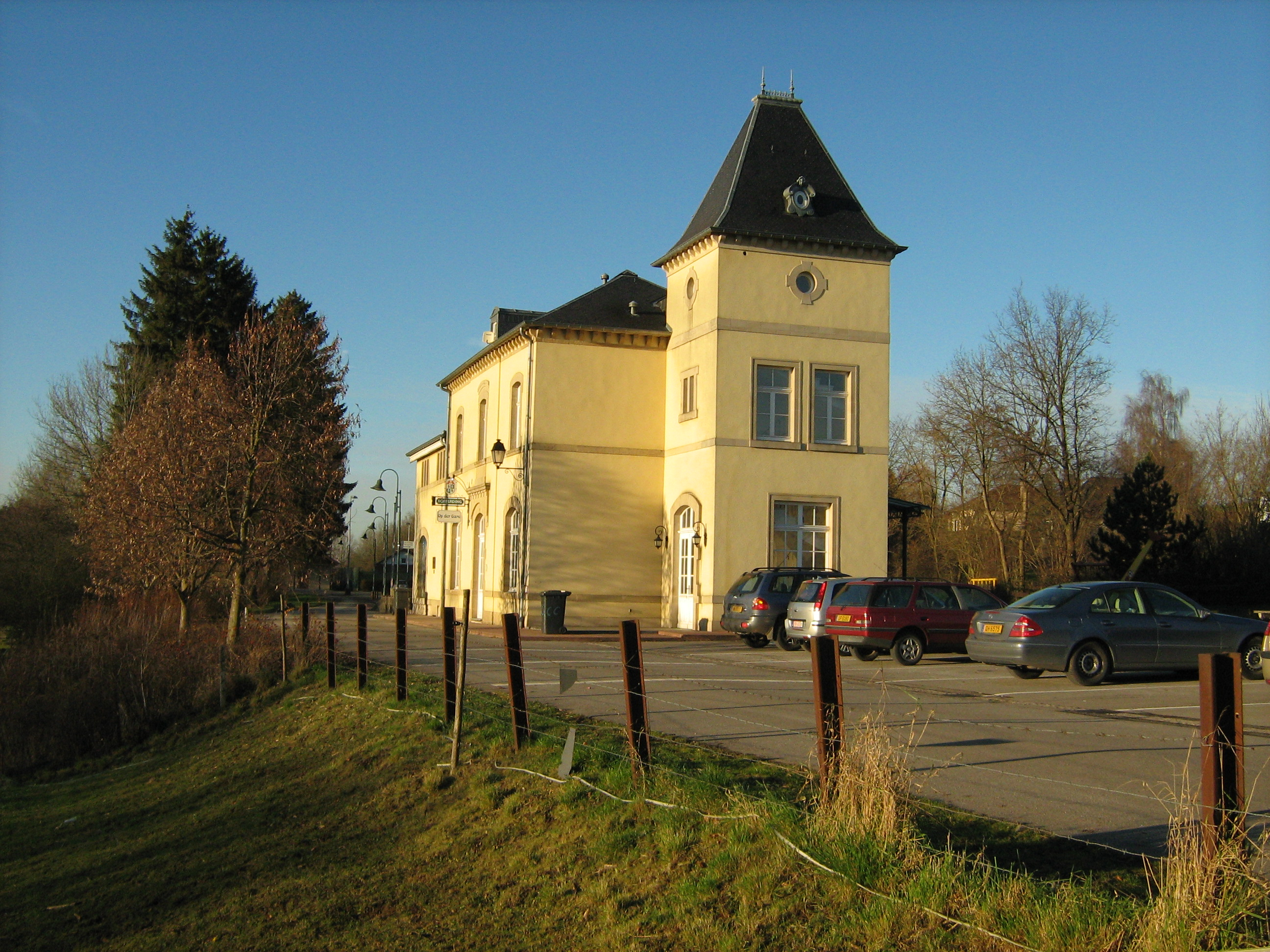
The old Clemency railway station

Clemency formed a separate commune of the same name until 1 January 2012, when it merged with Bascharage to form a new commune named Käerjeng. The law creating Käerjeng was passed on 10 May 2011.

The former commune consisted of the villages:

- Clemency
- Fingig
- Schockmillen (lieu-dit)
- Nuechtbann (lieu-dit)
- Neudrisch (lieu-dit)

At an altitude of 395 metres (1,296 ft), the commune's highest point was in the village of Fingig.

== The castle ==
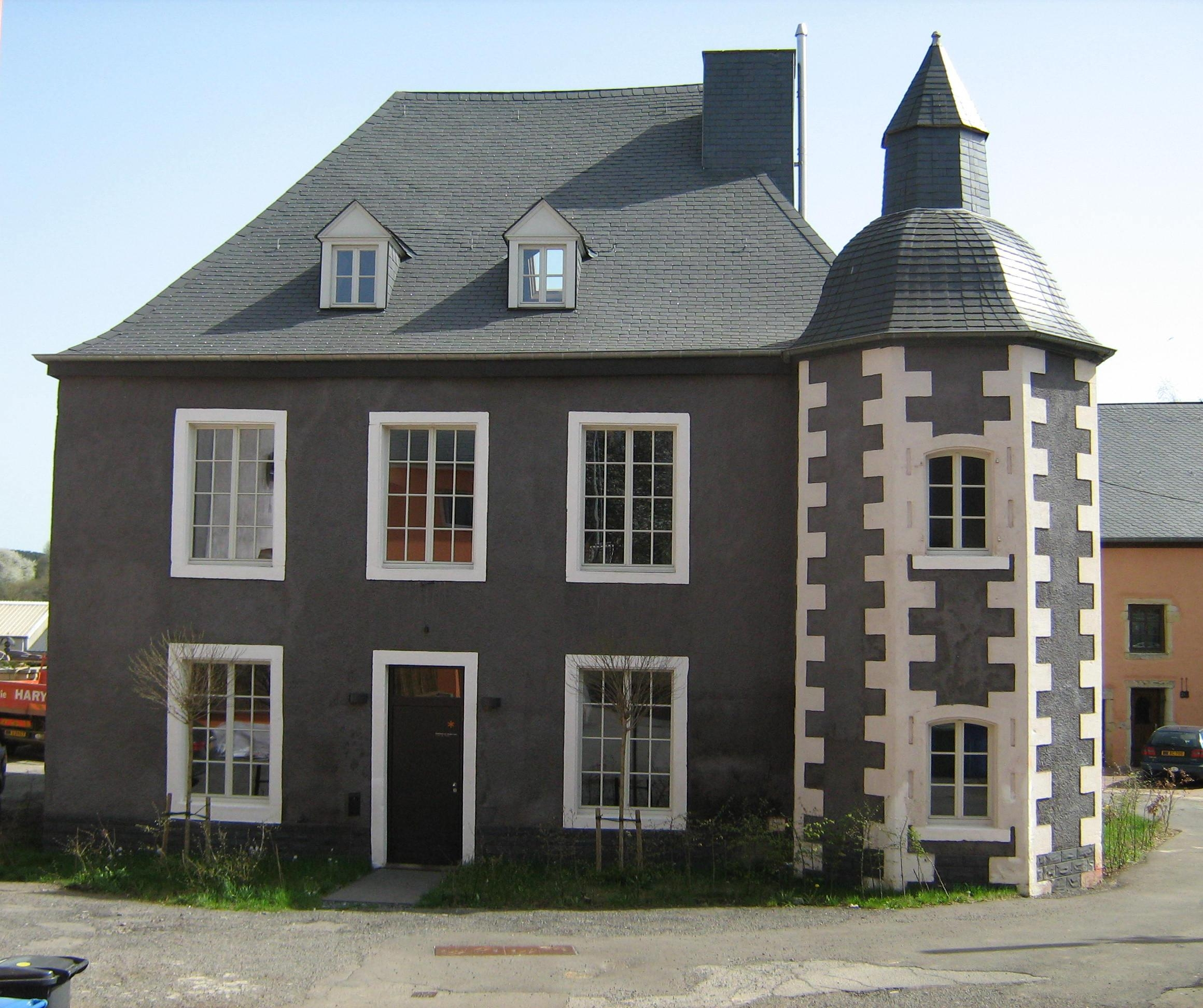
Clemency Castle

Clemency also has a small residential castle located close to the church in the centre of the town. Built in the 1660s, Clemency Castle had fallen into disrepair but in 2009 extensive renovation work was completed. As a result, the castle is now open to the public from time to time.

== Clemency today ==
Clemency continues to be primarily an agricultural community although it has recently been expanding as a residential area in view of its proximity to the E25 motorway. A few small companies have also been established there. It is also a good centre for walking and cycling, particularly as it is on the P12 cycle track from Lamadelaine to Colmar-Berg.

== Twinning ==
The commune of Clemency was twinned with Gaflenz in Steyr-Land, Austria.
