= Fingig =

Town in the commune of Käerjeng in Luxembourg

Coordinates: 49°36′N 5°54′E

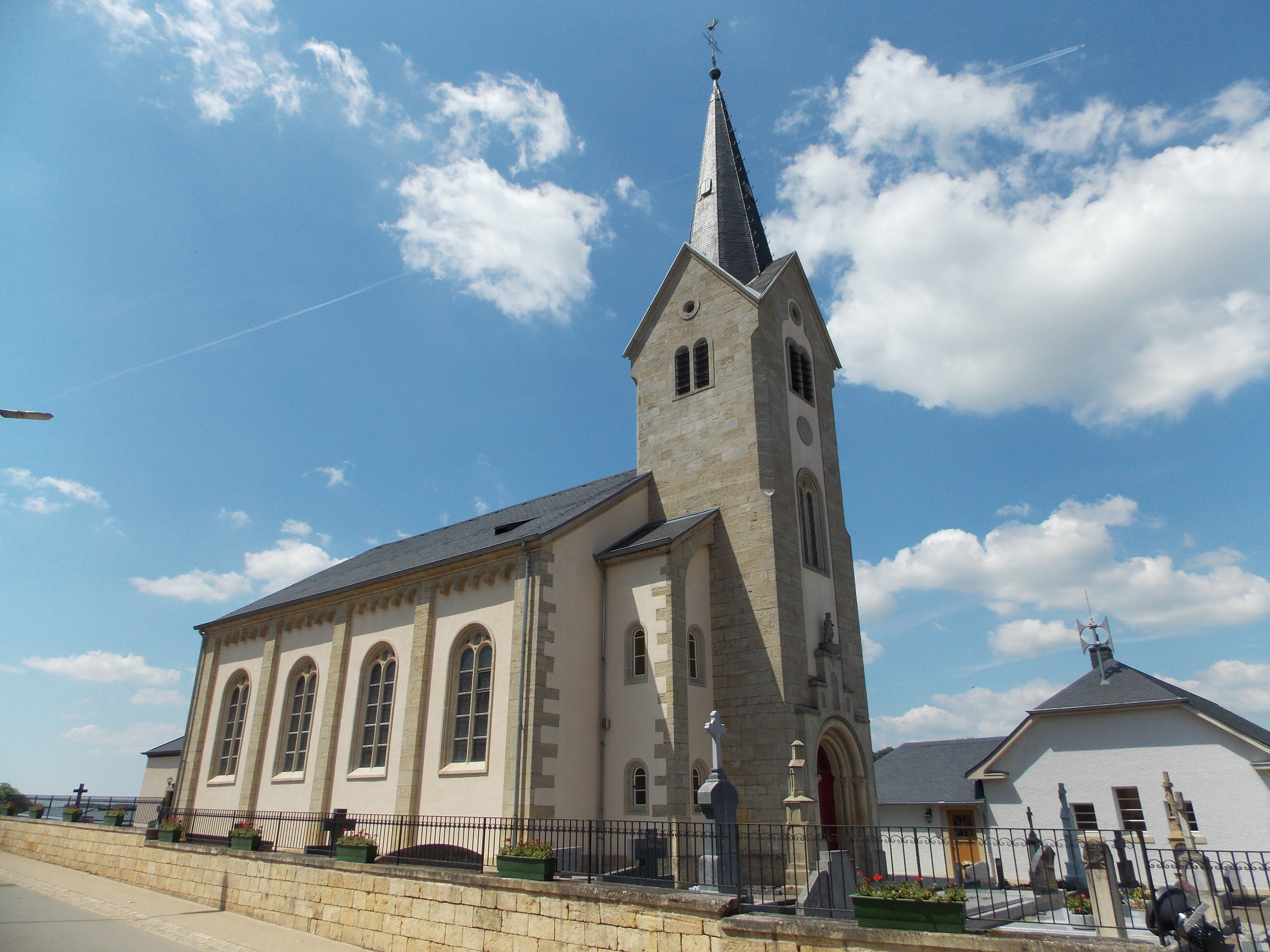
St Mathias Church in Fingig

Fingig (German pronunciation: [ˈfɪŋɪç]; Luxembourgish: Féngeg, Féngig) is a small town in the commune of Käerjeng, in western Luxembourg. As of September 2026, the town has a population of 547. Nearby is the source of the Eisch.
