= Linger, Luxembourg =

Town in the commune of Bascharage in Luxembourg

Coordinates: 49°34′N 5°53′E

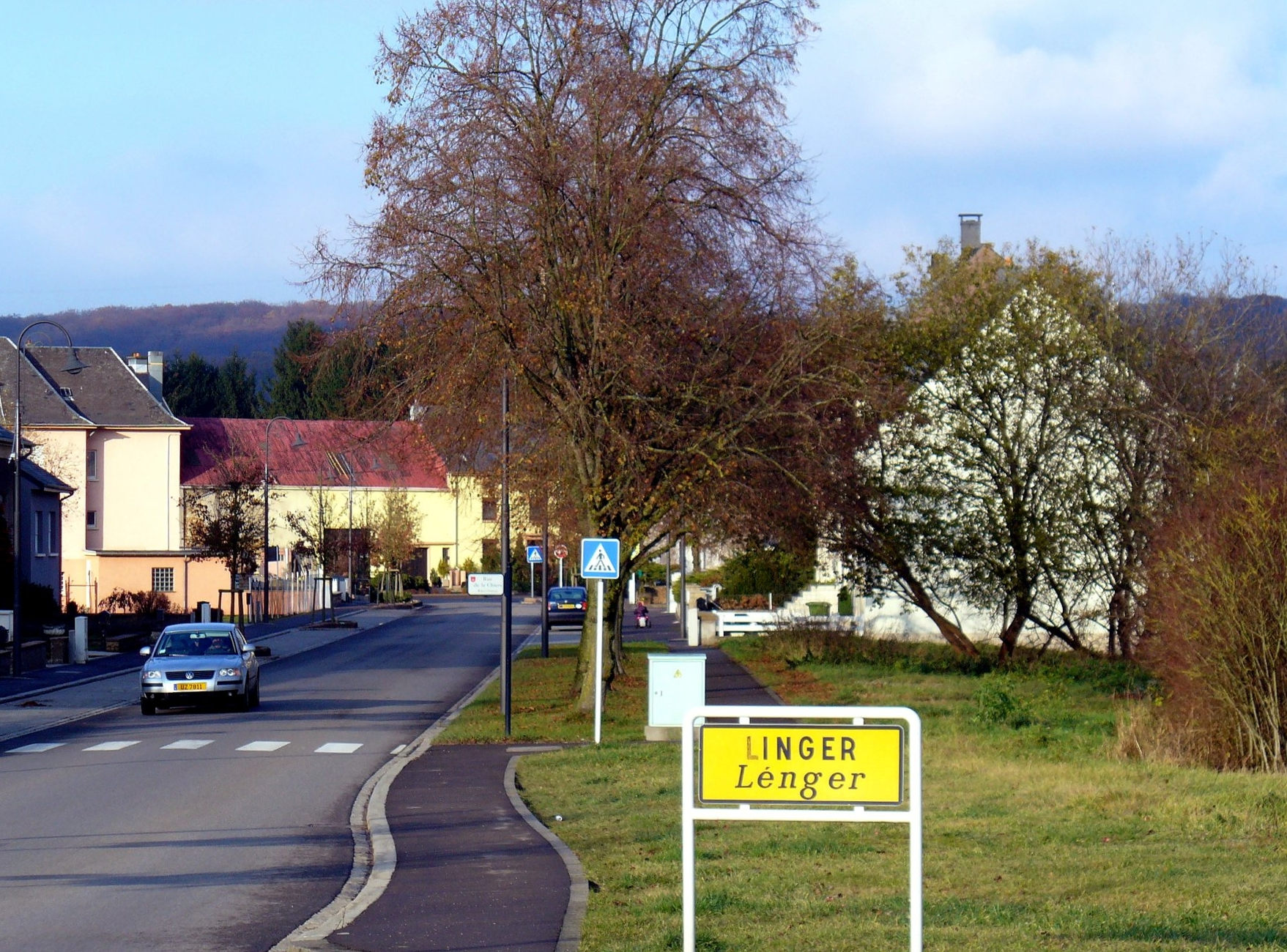
Linger Village Sign

Linger (German pronunciation: [ˈlɪŋɐ]; Luxembourgish: Lénger) is a small town in the commune of Bascharage, in south-western Luxembourg. As of 2023, the town has a population of 644.
