= Brasserie de Luxembourg =

Second largest brewery in Luxembourg

- Brasserie de Luxembourg
- Location: Diekirch, Luxembourg
- Opened: 1871
- Annual production volume: 150,000 hectolitres (130,000 US bbl)
- Owned by: Anheuser-Busch InBev
- Website: Brasserie de Luxembourg

Brasserie de Luxembourg is the second largest brewery in Luxembourg, based in Diekirch. They also export to Belgium. They brew beer under the brand name Diekirch and Mousel.

The Brasserie de Luxembourg was born in 2000 from the fusion of two breweries: The Brasserie Diekirch, founded in 1871, and the Brasserie Mousel founded in 1825.

== History ==
2000 : Fusion of Diekirch and Mousel and takeover by Anheuser-Busch InBev

== Beers ==
The following brands are sold under the Diekirch name: Diekirch and Mousel

== See also ==
- Beer in Luxembourg
