= Clausen, Luxembourg City =

District of Luxembourg City, Luxembourg

Clausen
- District

- Clausen is one of 24 districts in Luxembourg City
- Country: Luxembourg
- Commune: Luxembourg City

Area
  - Total: 0.3606 km^{2} (0.1392 sq mi)

Population (31 December 2025)
  - Total: 1,050
  - Density: 2,910/km^{2} (7,540/sq mi)

Nationality
  - Luxembourgish: 28.00%
  - Other: 72.00%
- Website: Clausen

Clausen (Luxembourgish pronunciation: [ˈklɑʊ̯zən]; German pronunciation: [ˈklaʊzn̩]) is a district in central Luxembourg City, in southern Luxembourg. Clausen is one of the oldest neighbourhoods in the city of Luxembourg with its earlier history tying back to that of the breweries in the area during the 12th century. It is now a hot spot for nightlife with a number of trendy bars and restaurants.

As of 31 December 2025, the district has a population of 1,050 inhabitants, of whom 28% possessed Luxembourgish nationality, and 72% were of other nationalities.

Its parish church, dedicated to Saint Cunegonde, is the location for Luxembourg's weekly celebration of Tridentine Mass on Sundays.

The church has a number of notable wall paintings depicting the life of St. Cunegonde.

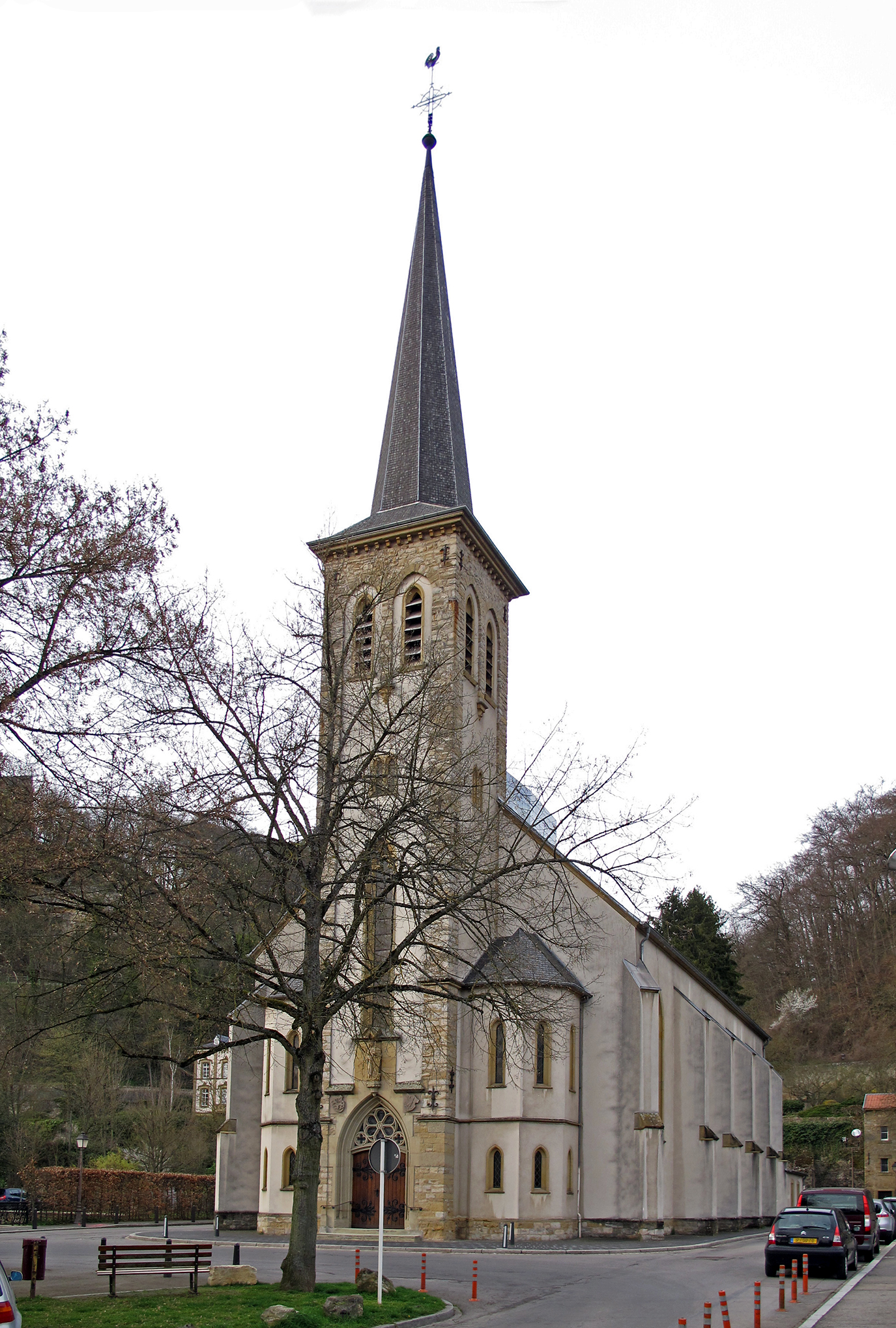
St. Cunegonde, location of Luxembourg's only regular Sunday Tridentine Mass

== Notable former residents ==
The statesman and one of the founding fathers of the EU, Robert Schuman, was born in a property rented by his parents on rue Jules Wilhelm within the district. He later attended the local primary school. In 1985 the house was purchased by the state and is now home to a small research institute. The baptismal font used for his baptism into the Catholic church may be found in the local parish church of St. Cunegonde where an image in his boyhood likeness may also be found on a large wall painting to the left of the altar depicting an event in the life of St. Cunegonde. The artist used local people as models for a crowd scene and the young Robert Schuman was used to represent a small boy.
