= Bascharage =

Town and former commune of Luxembourg

Bascharage Nidderkäerjeng (Luxembourgish)
- Former commune
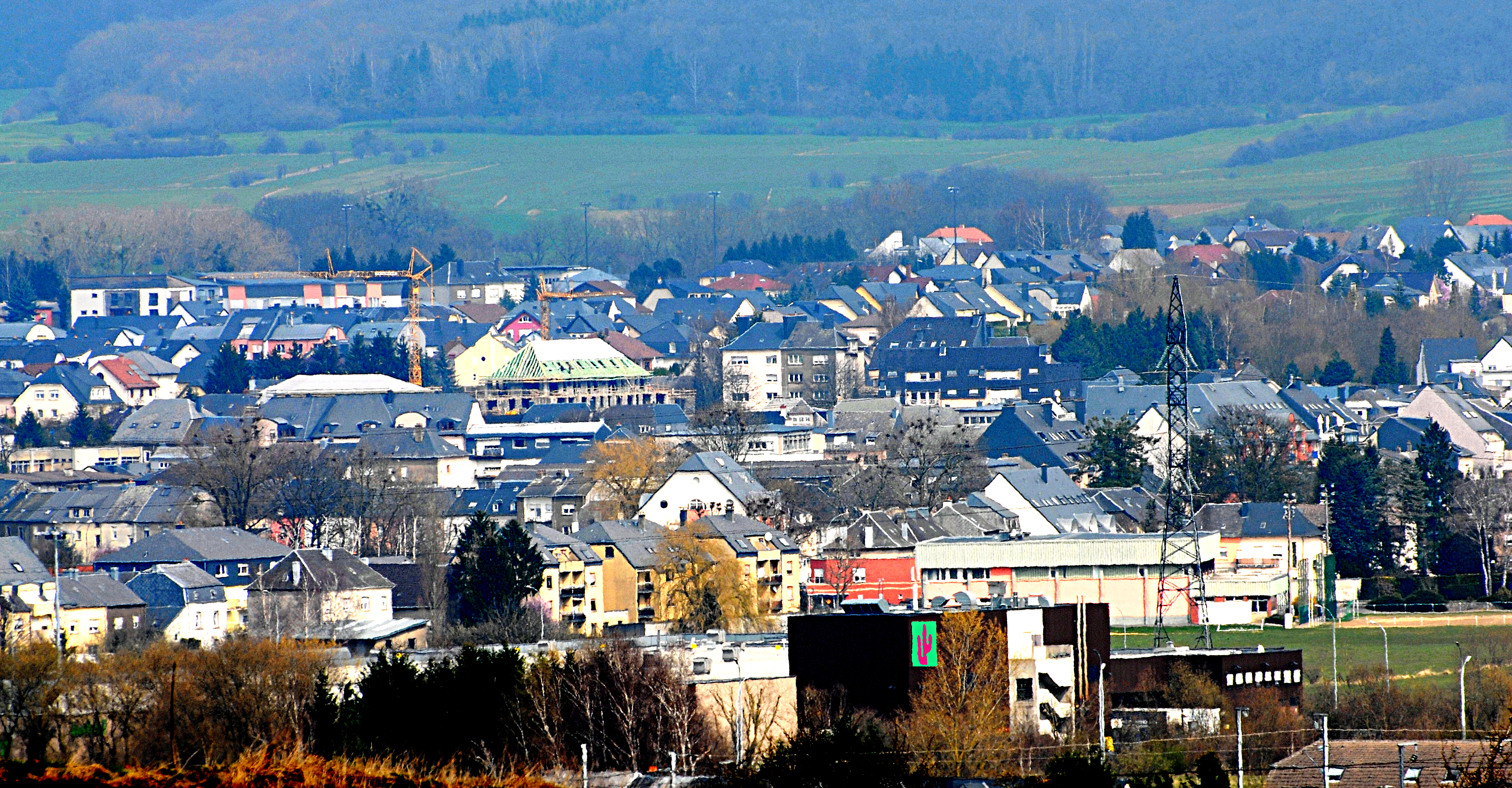

- Coat of arms

- Map of Luxembourg with Bascharage highlighted in orange, and the canton in dark red
- Coordinates: 49.5667°N 5.9167°E
- Country: Luxembourg
- Canton: Capellen
- Time zone: UTC+1 (CET)
  - Summer (DST): UTC+2 (CEST)
- Website: käerjeng.lu

Bascharage (Note: French pronunciation: [bɑʃaʁaʒ]; Luxembourgish: Nidderkäerjeng [ˈnidɐˌkɛːɐ̯ʒeŋ]; German: Niederkerschen [ˈniːdɐˌkɛʁʃn̩]; all lit. 'Lower Charage/Käerjeng/Kerschen', in contrast to "Upper Charage/Käerjeng/Kerschen")) is a town in the canton of Capellen, in south-western Luxembourg. It was part of the commune of the same name until 2012, when it merged with Clemency to form the new commune of Käerjeng. As of September 2026, the town had a population of 6198.

== Geography ==
Bascharage is located in the commune of Käerjeng, in the Canton of Capellen, in south-western Luxembourg. The town is crossed by the river Chiers, which is fed by the Mierbech stream.

== History ==
Bascharage with the other towns like Linger, Hautcharage, and Pétange were owned by the "Hoheit Kerschen". The first known reference to them was on 4 April 1281, for obtaining their freedom under the law of Beamont "Freiheitsbrief nach Böhmerrecht". The freedom of Clemency probably happened in 1260.

After the occupation of France (1794 – 1815), the "Hoheit Kerschen" became the "municipalité cantonale Bascharage" alongside Clemency, Mamer, Garnich, and Dippach. Bascharage became a commune in 1799, comprising the towns of Bascharage, Hautchaurage, and Linger. Their first mayor was Pierre Clemont in 1800.

=== Commune status ===
Bascharage formed a separate commune of the same name until 1 January 2012, when it merged with Clemency to form a new commune named Käerjeng. The law creating Käerjeng was passed on 10 May 2011.

The former commune consisted of the villages:

- Bascharage
- Hautcharage
- Linger

=== Amorial Bearings ===
The arms were conferred on the town by Grand Ducal decree of 21 July 1969.

=== Mayors from 1858 to 2011 ===
- Jean Nicolas Schumacher
- Pierre Schütz
- Jules Hemmer
- Jean Peschong
- Théophile Aubart
- Nicolas Meyers
- Robert Steichen
- Marcel Gillen
- André Siebenbour
- Joseph Thill
- Jean Christophe
- Jeannot Halsdorf
- Michel Wolter

== Economy ==
Geologically, Bascharage does not belong to the Minette ore region. However, the area has a historical and sometimes tense relationship with the iron industry. The steel crisis of the 1970s was responsible for the loss of many jobs.

Even so, the town has known regular development with the arrival of enterprises like General Motors and Luxguard. Bascharage is also home to the headquarters of the nation's largest brewery, Brasserie Nationale, brewers of Bofferding beer.

An industrial zone was also born around 30 years ago which, today, regroups local and regional companies from big subsidiaries such as General Motors, Luxguard, and Delphi Corporation.

=== Transportation ===
Bascharage, along with the nearby town of Sanem, is served by Bascharage-Sanem railway station, on CFL Line 70.

== Sports ==
- UN Käerjéng 97 (football)
- HBC Bascharage (handball)
- Bascharage Hedgehogs (basketball)

== Notable residents ==
- Claus Cito (1882–1965), sculptor of the Gëlle Fra war memorial, born in Bascharage
