= Piano (disambiguation) =

A piano is a keyboard music instrument.

Piano may also refer to:

== Places ==
- Piano, Haute-Corse, a commune of the Haute-Corse département on the island of Corsica, France
- Piano di Sorrento, an Italian commune of the Metropolitan City of Naples, Campania
- Piano Vetrale, an Italian hamlet of the Province of Salerno, Campania
- Pianos (club), a live music venue in New York City

== People ==
- Renzo Piano (born 1937), Italian architect

== Companies ==
- Piano (company), an independent film production and distribution company
- Piano Media, a SaaS company specializing in advanced media business processes and online commerce optimization software

== Art, entertainment, and media ==
=== Anime and television ===
- Piano (TV series), a South Korean television drama
- Piano: The Melody of a Young Girl's Heart, a 2002 anime series
- The Piano (TV series), a 2023 British televised talent show
- "The Piano" (Steptoe and Son), a 1962 episode

=== Music ===
- Piano, a dynamic direction in music, often appearing in sheet music as p and indicating that the performer should play softly

==== Albums ====
- The Piano (Herbie Hancock album), 1979
- Piano (Wynton Kelly album), 1958
- Piano (George Shearing album), 1989
- The Piano (soundtrack), 1993 soundtrack by Michael Nyman to the film of the same name
- A Piano: The Collection, a 2006 five-disc box set by Tori Amos

==== Songs ====
- "Piano", a song from Ariana Grande's 2013 album Yours Truly
- "The Piano", a song from PJ Harvey's 2007 album White Chalk

=== Other art, entertainment and media ===
- Piano (play), a 1990 stage play
- "Piano", a 1918 poem by D. H. Lawrence
- The Piano, a 1993 film starring Harvey Keitel, Holly Hunter and Sam Neill
- Piano (company), an independent film production and distribution company
- Giuoco Piano, a chess opening
- The Piano (TV series), a British television show for Channel 4

== Architecture ==
- Piano rialzato, a mezzanine or raised ground floor, e.g., to defend against acqua alta
- Piano nobile, the principal floor of a large house

== See also ==
- Pianist (disambiguation)
- Grand Piano (disambiguation)
- Pianoforte (disambiguation)
- "Pjanoo", 2008 single by Eric Prydz
