= Panigarola =

Panigarola may refer to:

- Arcangela Panigarola (1468–1525), Italian Augustinian nun and mystic
- Francesco Panigarola (1548–1594), Italian Franciscan preacher, controversialist and bishop
- Casa Panigarola, historic building of Milan

== See also ==
- Panicarola
