= Piane =

Piane may refer to:

- Lucian Piane (born 1980), American composer and music producer
- Piane Sesia, frazione of the municipality of Serravalle Sesia, in Piedmont, northern Italy
- Piane di Collevecchio, frazione of the Italian comune of Montorio al Vomano

== See also ==
- Piana (disambiguation)
