= Piana =

Piana may refer to

== Places ==
In Italy

- Piana Crixia, a comune
- Piana, Perugia, a comune
- Piana degli Albanesi, a comune
- Giffoni Valle Piana, a town and comune
- Calanques de Piana, an inlet
- Monte Piana, a mountain
- Piana degli Albanesi Cathedral

Elsewhere

- Piana, Arcadia, a village in Greece
- Piana, Corse-du-Sud, a commune in France
- Piana, Polish name for Peene, a river in Germany, near the German-Polish border
- Pyana, a river in Nizhny Novgorod Oblast and the Republic of Mordovia, Russia
- Parque Luis Méndez Piana, a multi-use stadium in Uruguay

== Other ==
- Piana (moth), a synonym of the moth genus Crioa
- Piana (surname)
- Loro Piana, an Italian clothing company
- Piana Clerico, a clothing company in Italy
- Loro Piana TomBoy, a racing horse
- Piana Canova PC.500, a single-seat sailplane
- Rich Piana, American bodybuilder and motivational speaker

== See also ==
- Piano (disambiguation)
