= Casamaggiore =

- Frazione
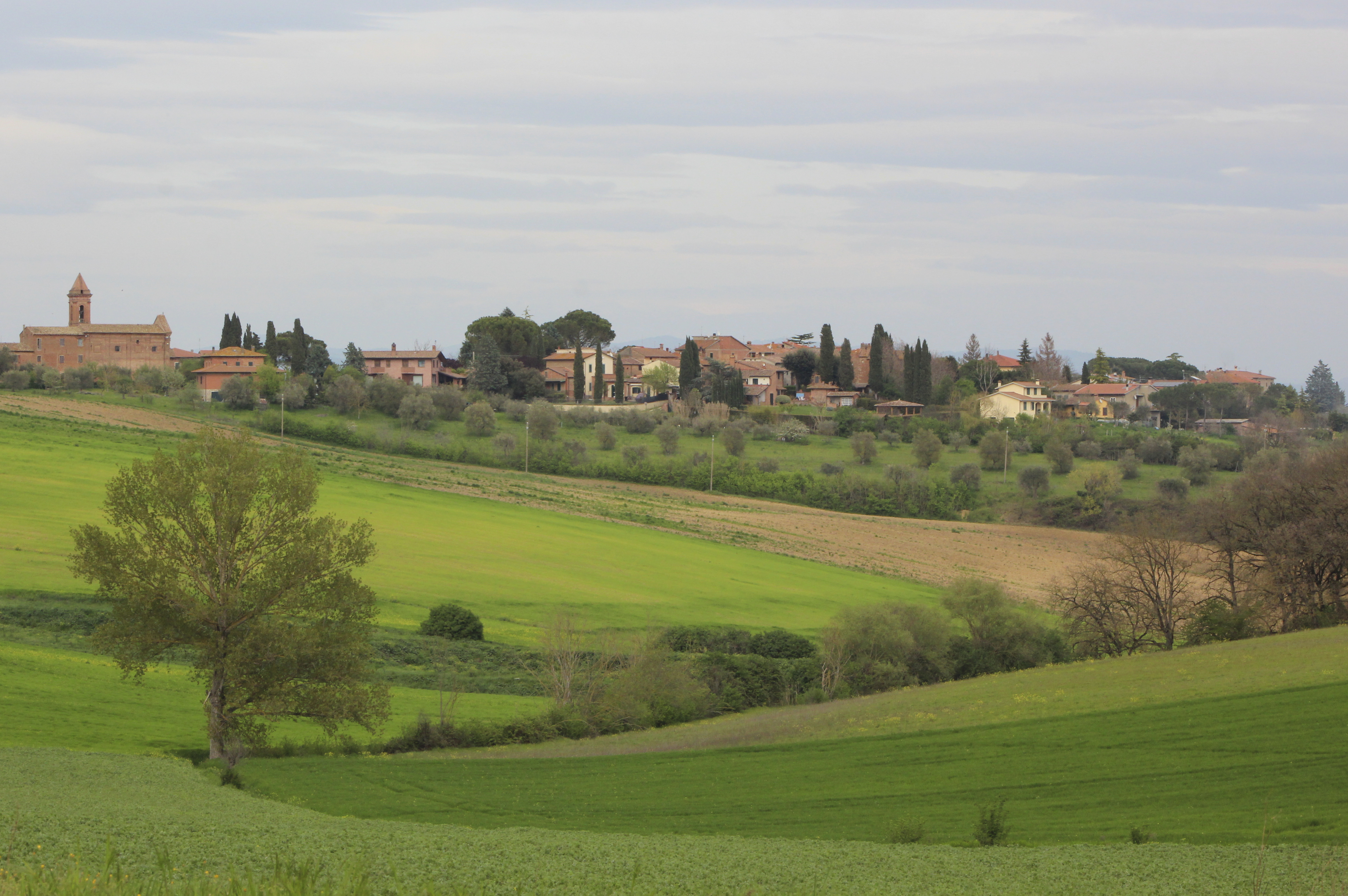
- Casamaggiore

- Location within Italy
- Coordinates: 43°06′07″N 11°58′16″E
- Country: Italy
- Region: Umbria
- Province: Perugia
- Comune: Castiglione del Lago
- Elevation: 356 m (1,168 ft)

Population (2001)
  - Total: 75
- Time zone: UTC+1 (CET)
  - Summer (DST): UTC+2 (CEST)
- Postcode: 06061
- Area code: 075

Casamaggiore is a frazione of the comune of Castiglione del Lago in the Province of Perugia, Umbria, central Italy. It stands at an elevation of 356 metres above sea level. At the time of the Istat census of 2001 it had 75 inhabitants.
