= Badia, Castiglione del Lago =

Badia
- Frazione
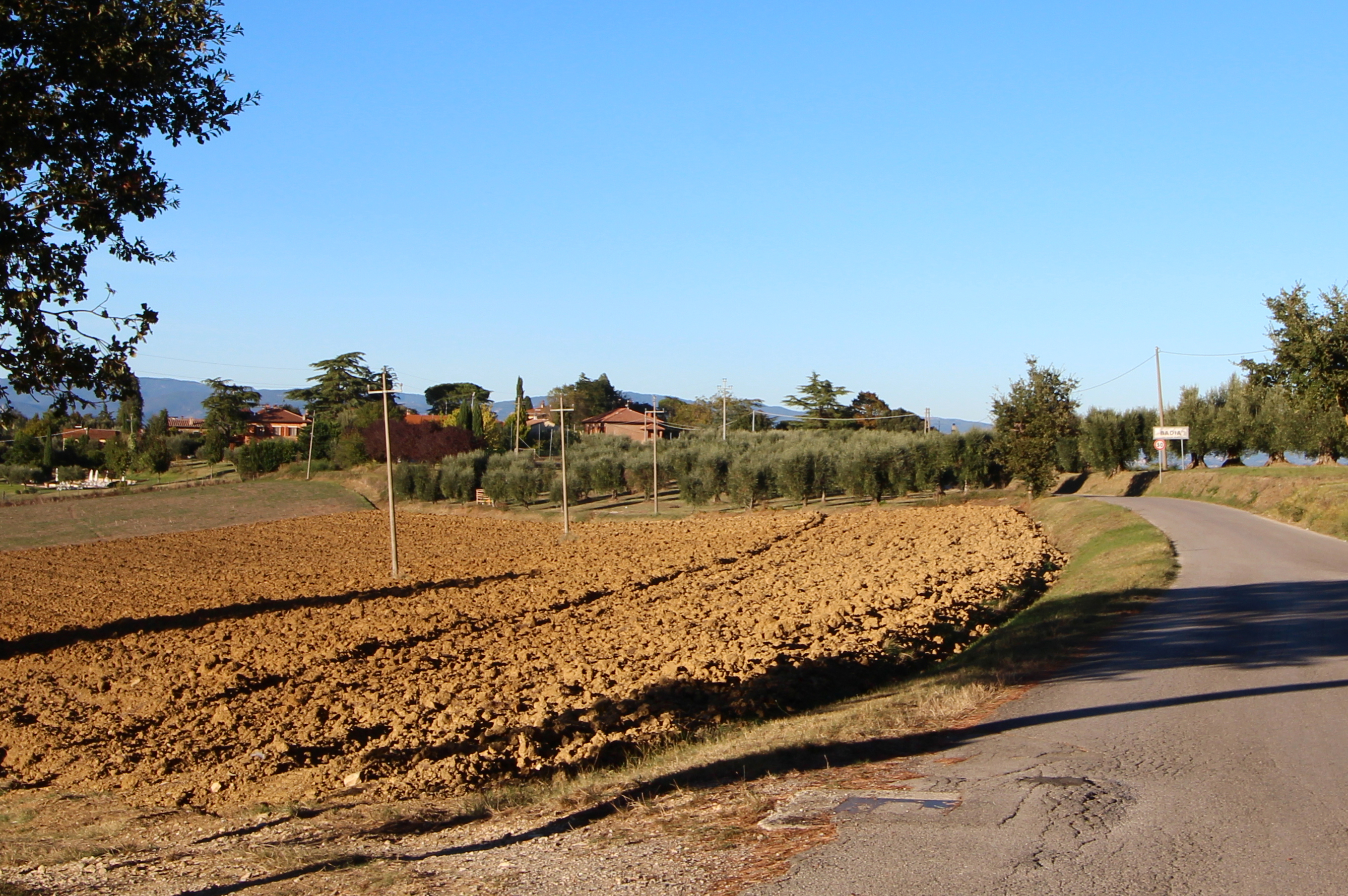
- Badia

- Location within Italy
- Coordinates: 43°05′18″N 12°00′42″E
- Country: Italy
- Region: Umbria
- Province: Perugia
- Comune: Castiglione del Lago
- Elevation: 324 m (1,063 ft)

Population (2001)
  - Total: 44
- Time zone: UTC+1 (CET)
  - Summer (DST): UTC+2 (CEST)
- Postcode: 06061
- Area code: 075

Badia is a frazione of the comune of Castiglione del Lago in the Province of Perugia, Umbria, central Italy. It stands at an elevation of 324 metres above sea level. At the time of the Istat census of 2001 it had 44 inhabitants.

Churches in Badia

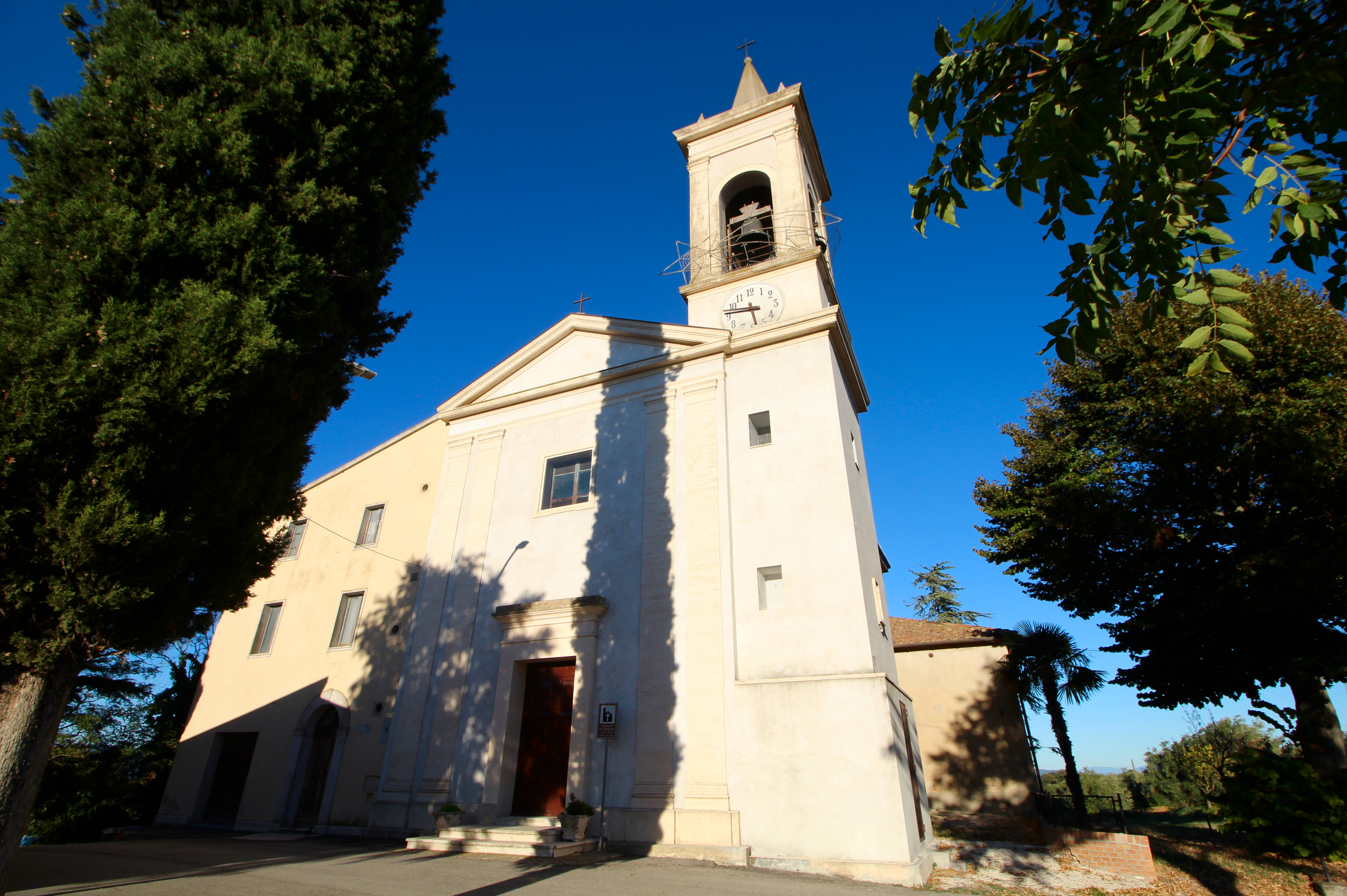
San Cristoforo

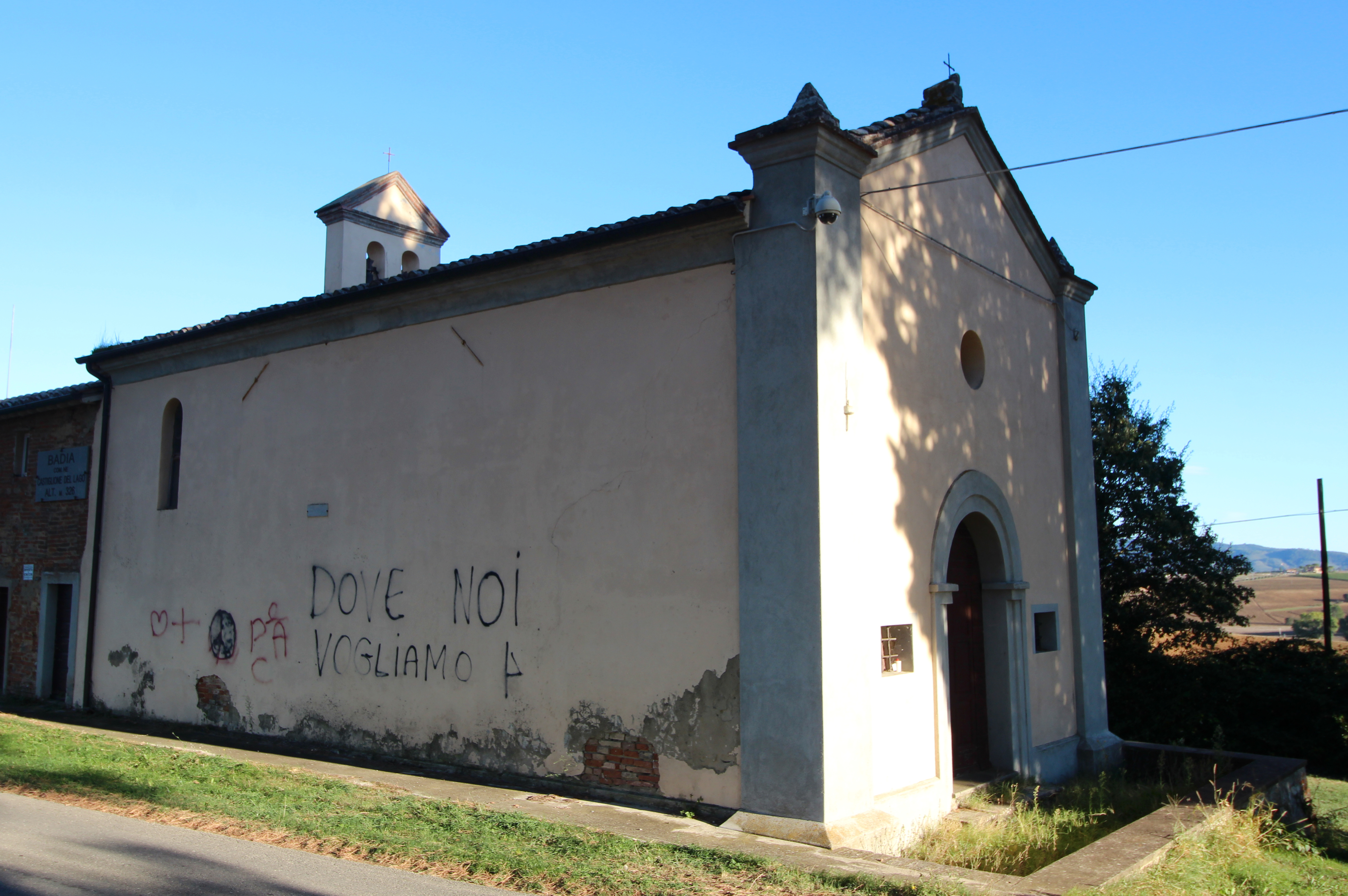
Santa Maria Assunta
