= Villastrada =

- Frazione
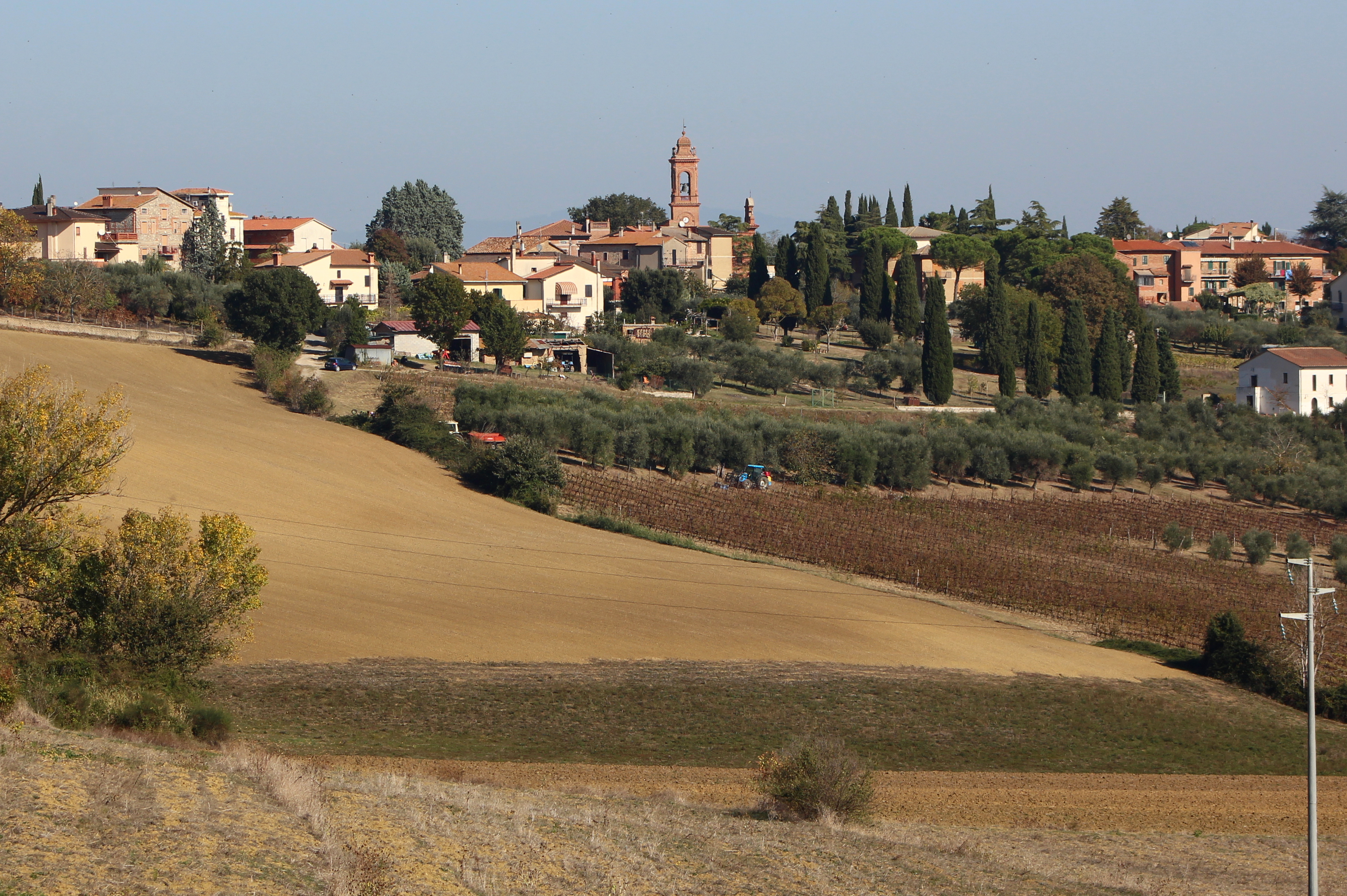
- Villastrada

- Location within Italy
- Coordinates: 43°02′55″N 12°00′42″E
- Country: Italy
- Region: Umbria
- Province: Perugia
- Comune: Castiglione del Lago
- Elevation: 354 m (1,161 ft)

Population (2001)
  - Total: 302
- Time zone: UTC+1 (CET)
  - Summer (DST): UTC+2 (CEST)
- Postcode: 06061
- Area code: 075

Villastrada is a frazione of the comune of Castiglione del Lago in the Province of Perugia, Umbria, central Italy. It stands at an elevation of 354 metres above sea level. At the time of the Istat census of 2001 it had 302 inhabitants.

Churches of Villastrada

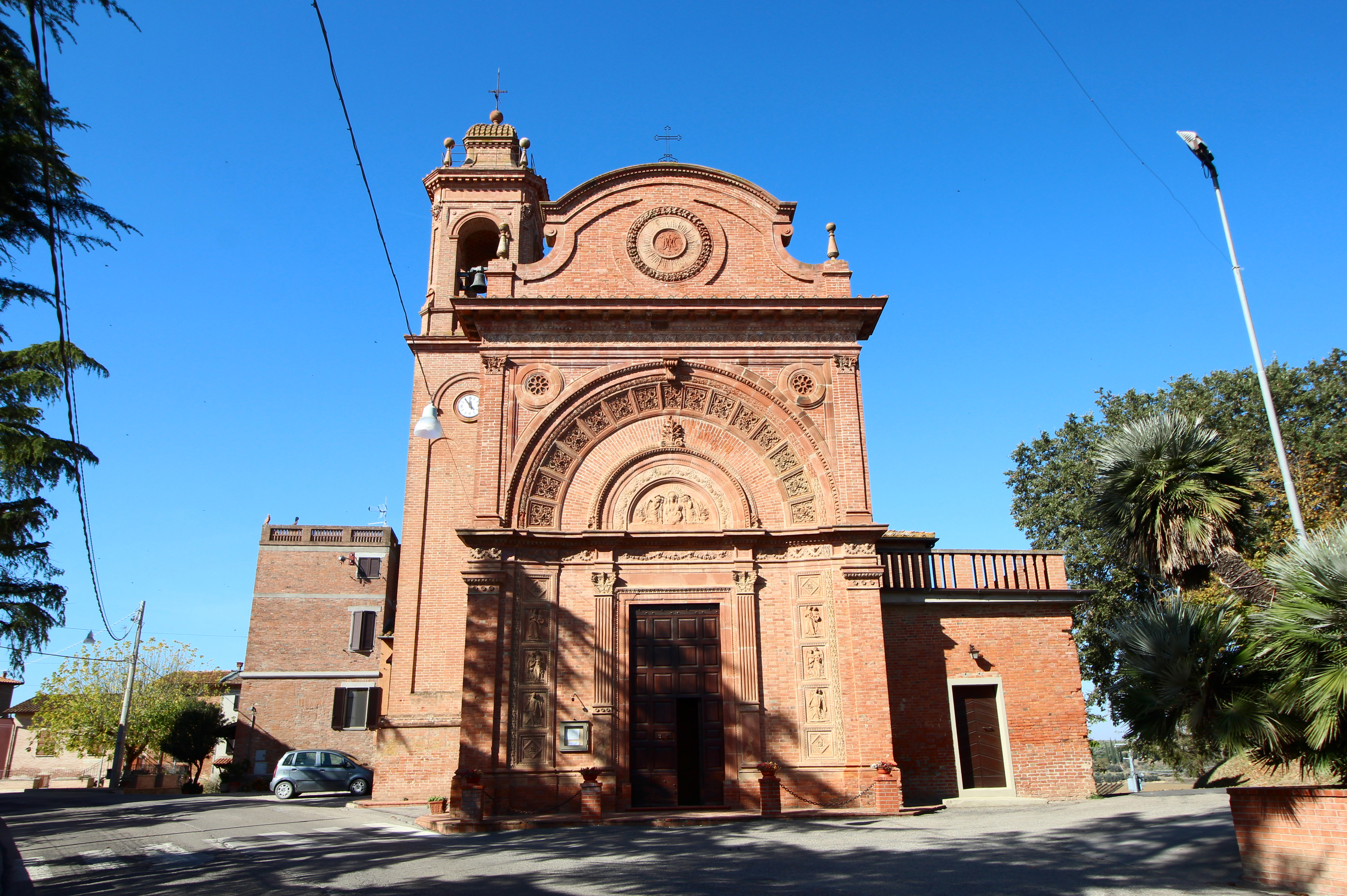
Santa Maria delle Grazie

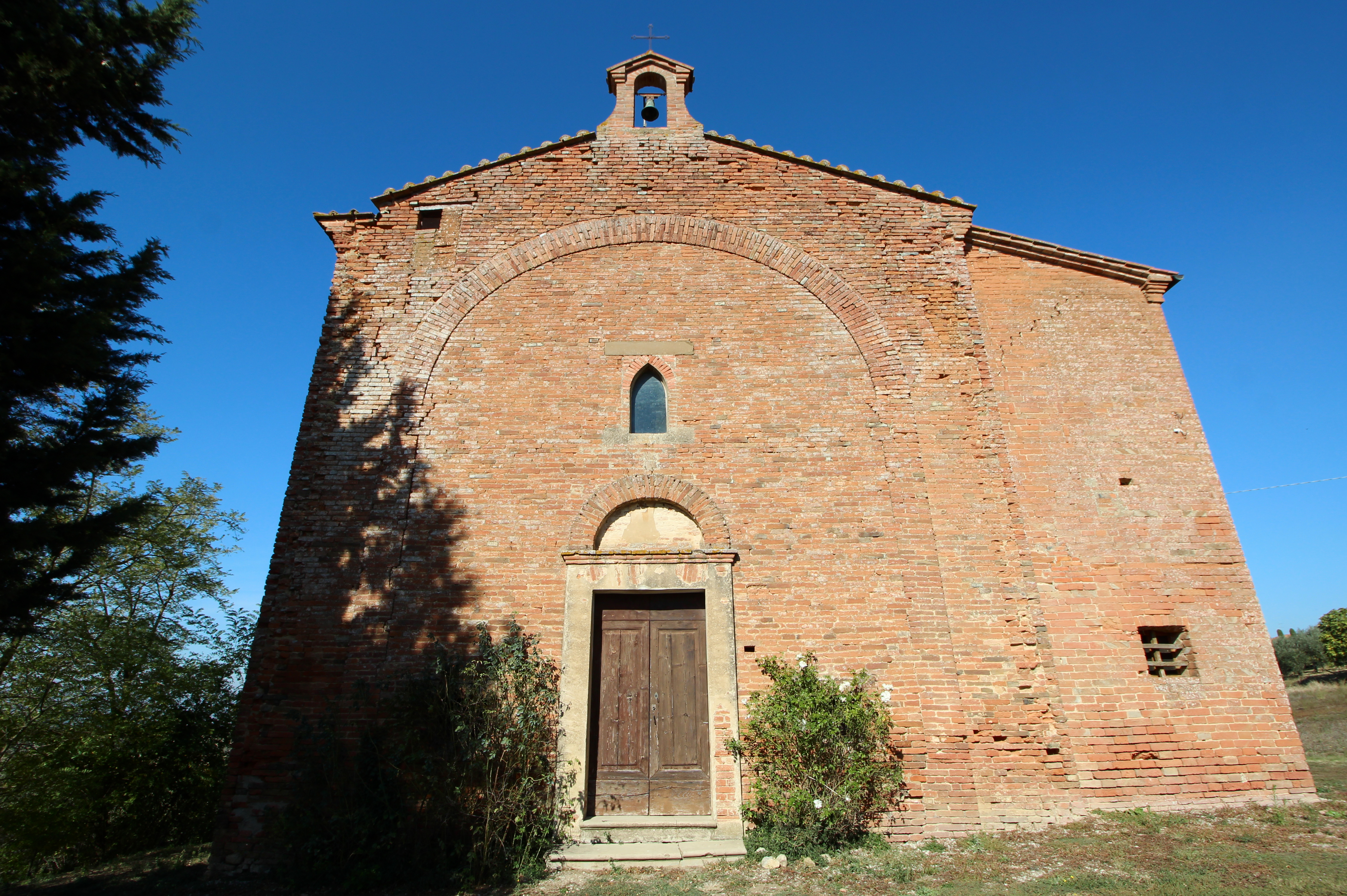
Madonna dei Poggi (località Poggi)
