= Gioiella =

- Frazione
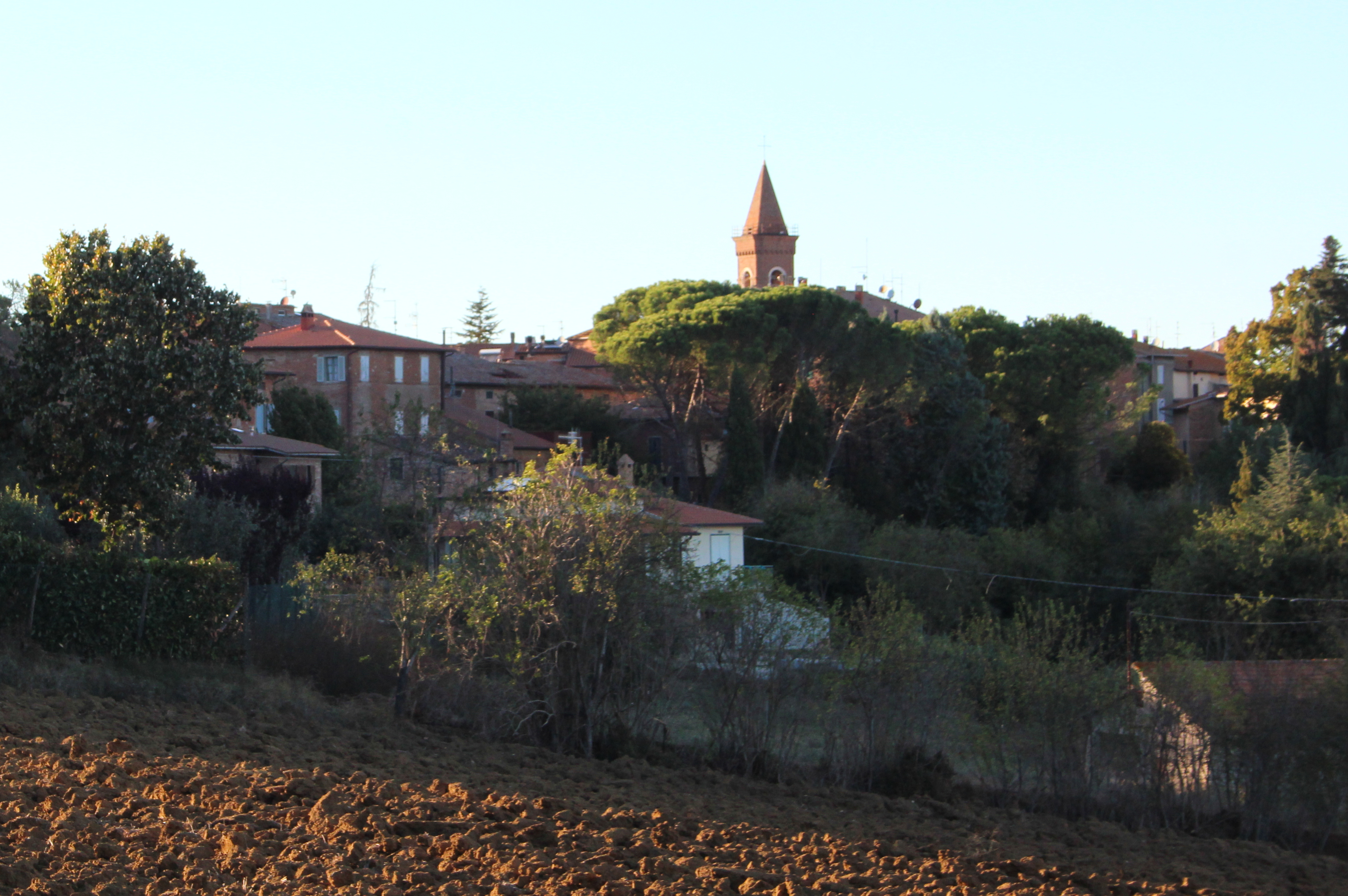
- Gioiella

- Location within Italy
- Coordinates: 43°05′37″N 11°58′19″E
- Country: Italy
- Region: Umbria
- Province: Perugia
- Comune: Castiglione del Lago
- Elevation: 366 m (1,201 ft)

Population (2001)
  - Total: 221
- Time zone: UTC+1 (CET)
  - Summer (DST): UTC+2 (CEST)
- Postcode: 06061
- Area code: 075

Gioiella is a frazione of the comune of Castiglione del Lago in the Province of Perugia, Umbria, central Italy. It stands at an elevation of 366 metres above sea level. At the time of the Istat census of 2001 it had 221 inhabitants.
