= Porto, Castiglione del Lago =

Porto
- Frazione
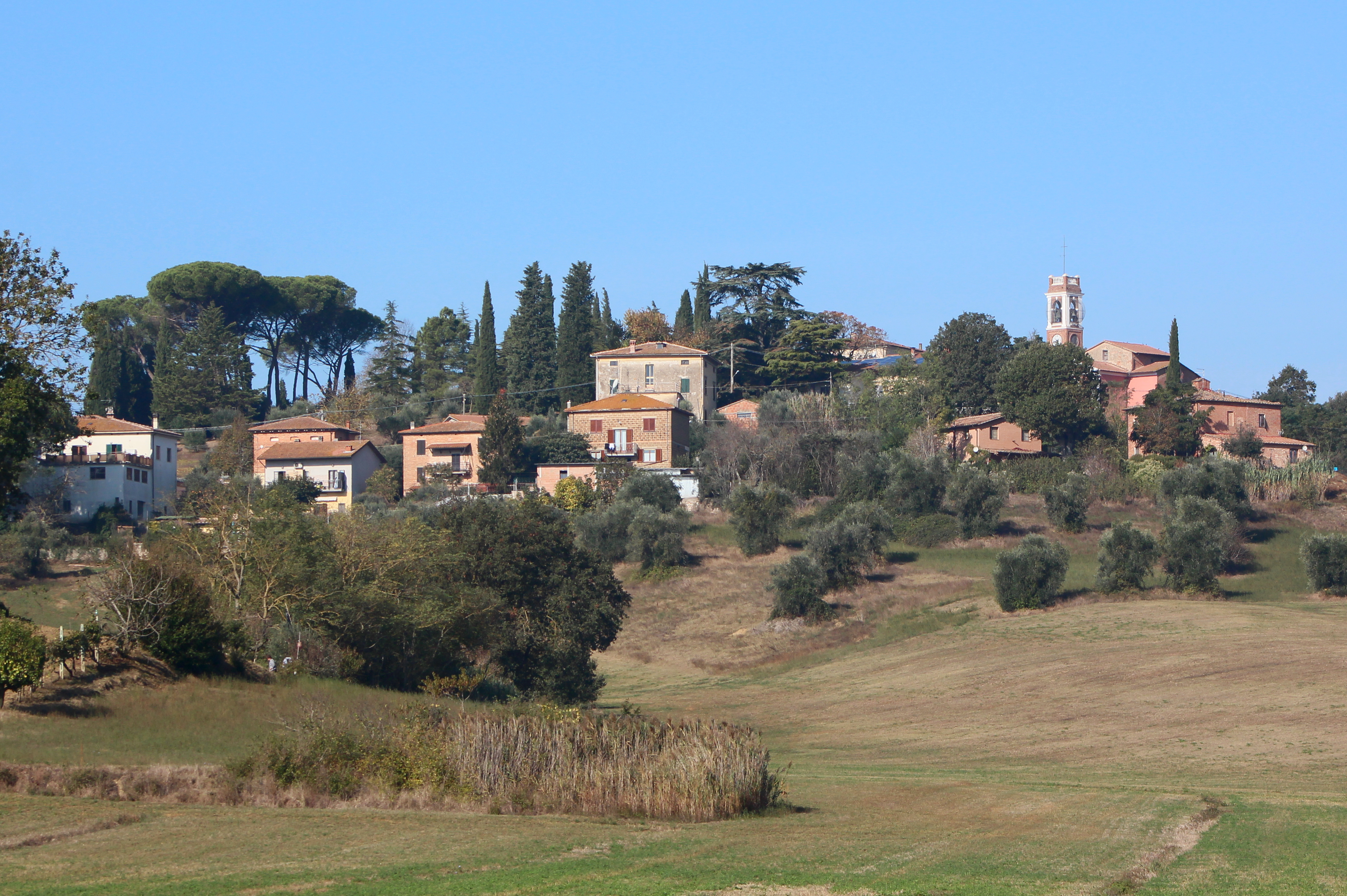
- Porto

- Location within Italy
- Coordinates: 43°04′17″N 11°56′33″E
- Country: Italy
- Region: Umbria
- Province: Perugia
- Comune: Castiglione del Lago
- Elevation: 300 m (980 ft)

Population (2001)
  - Total: 150
- Time zone: UTC+1 (CET)
  - Summer (DST): UTC+2 (CEST)
- Postcode: 06061
- Area code: 075

Porto is a frazione of the comune of Castiglione del Lago in the Province of Perugia, Umbria, central Italy. It stands at an elevation of 300 metres above sea level. At the time of the Istat census of 2001 it had 150 inhabitants.

Churches in Porto

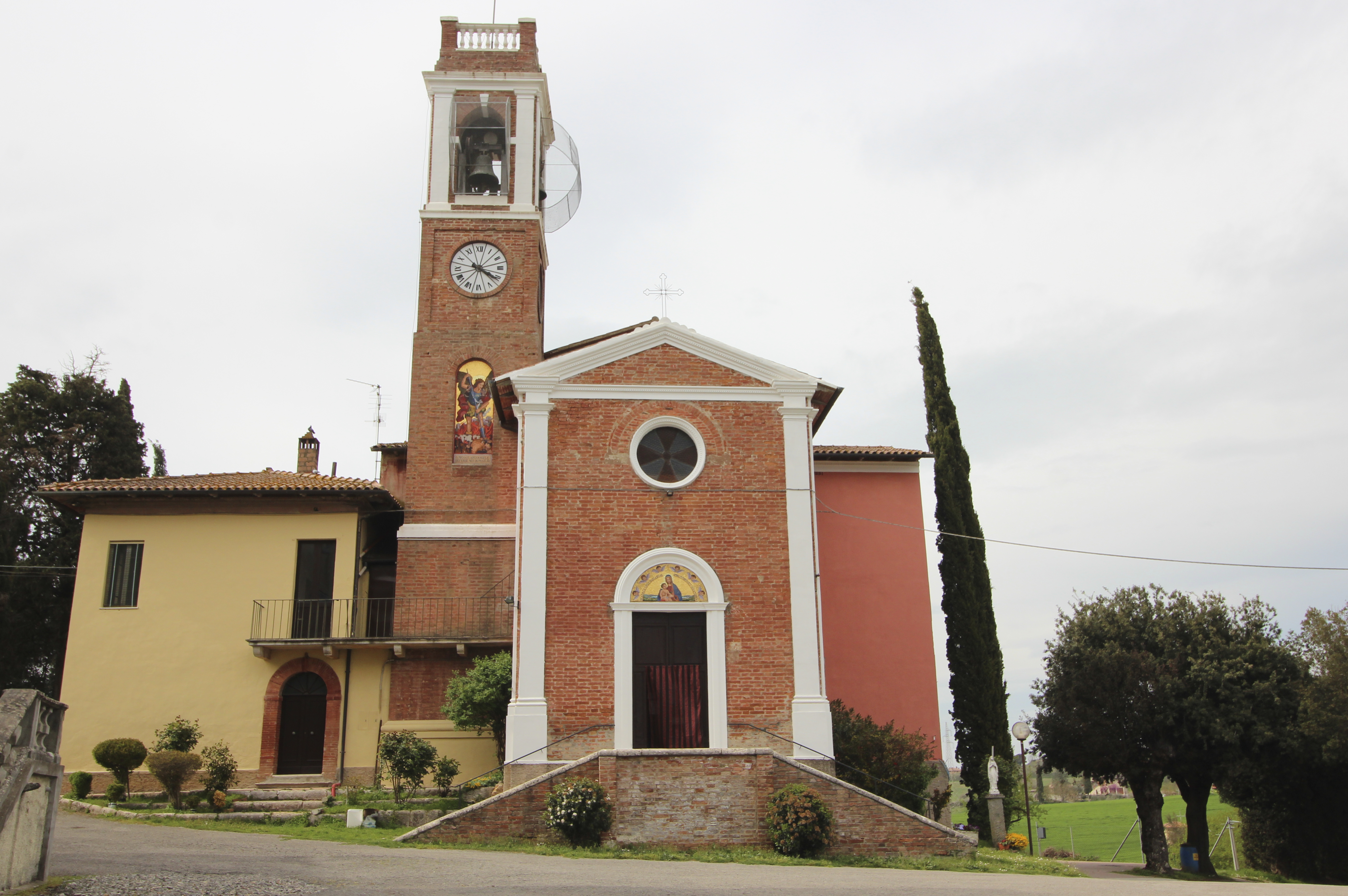
San Michele Arcangelo

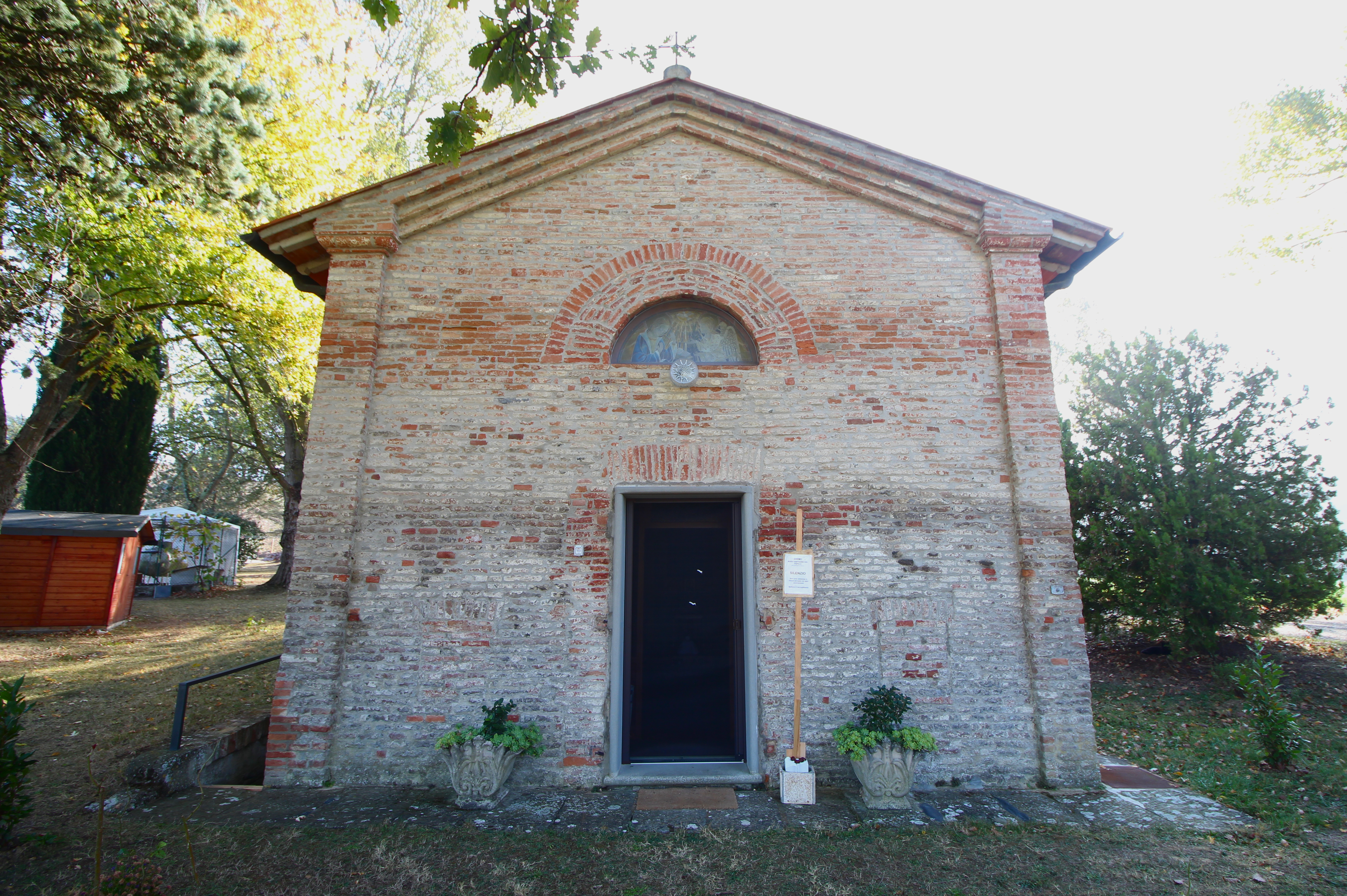
Santa Maria del Popolo (Madonna del Popolino)
