= Petrignano, Castiglione del Lago =

Petrignano
- Frazione
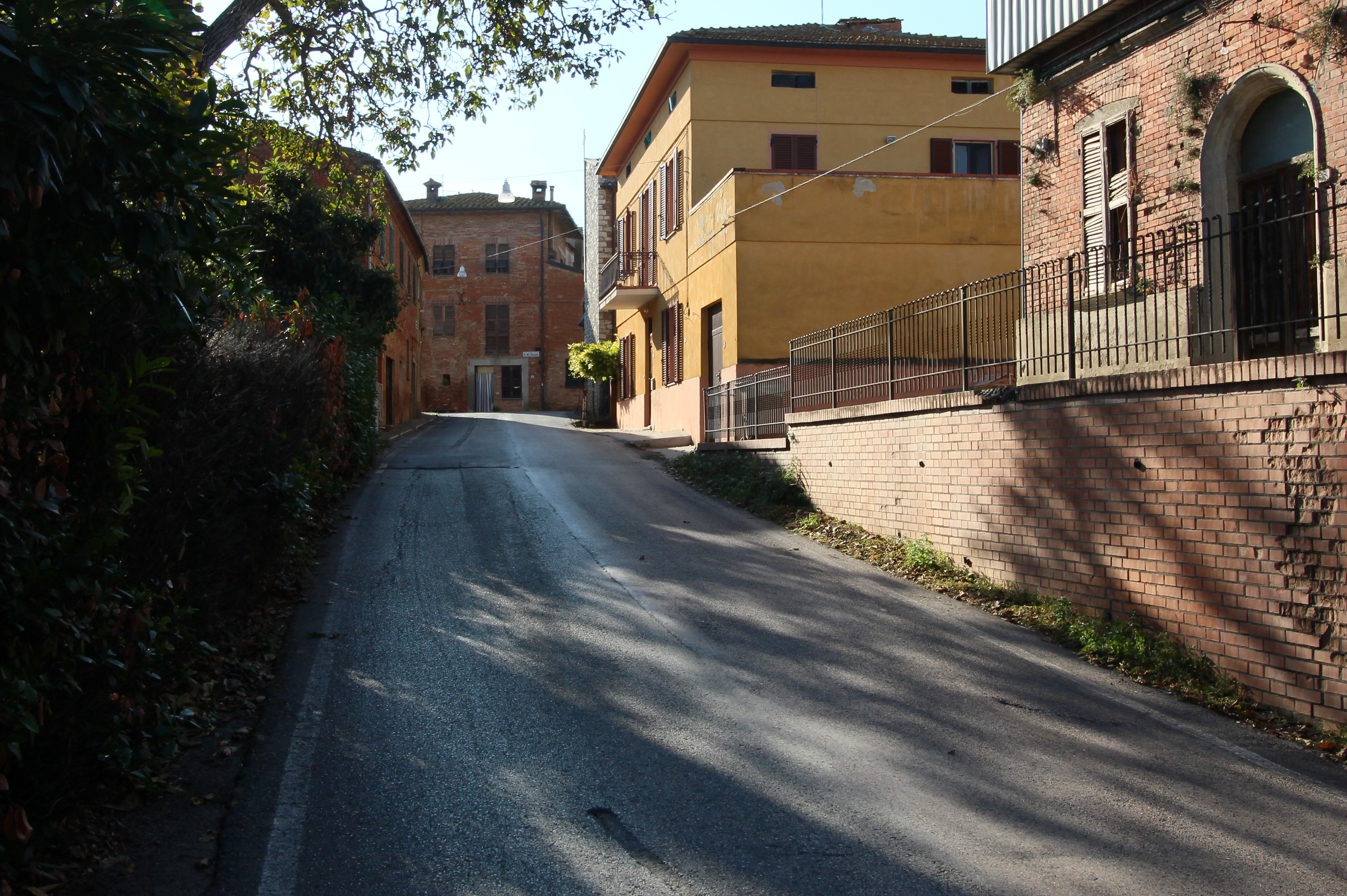
- Petrignano

- Location within Italy
- Coordinates: 43°09′09″N 11°56′23″E
- Country: Italy
- Region: Umbria
- Province: Perugia
- Comune: Castiglione del Lago
- Elevation: 338 m (1,109 ft)

Population (2001)
  - Total: 243
- Time zone: UTC+1 (CET)
  - Summer (DST): UTC+2 (CEST)
- Postcode: 06061
- Area code: 075

Petrignano is a frazione of the comune of Castiglione del Lago in the Province of Perugia, Umbria, central Italy. It stands at an elevation of 338 metres above sea level. At the time of the Istat census of 2001, it had 243 inhabitants.

Churches in Petrignano

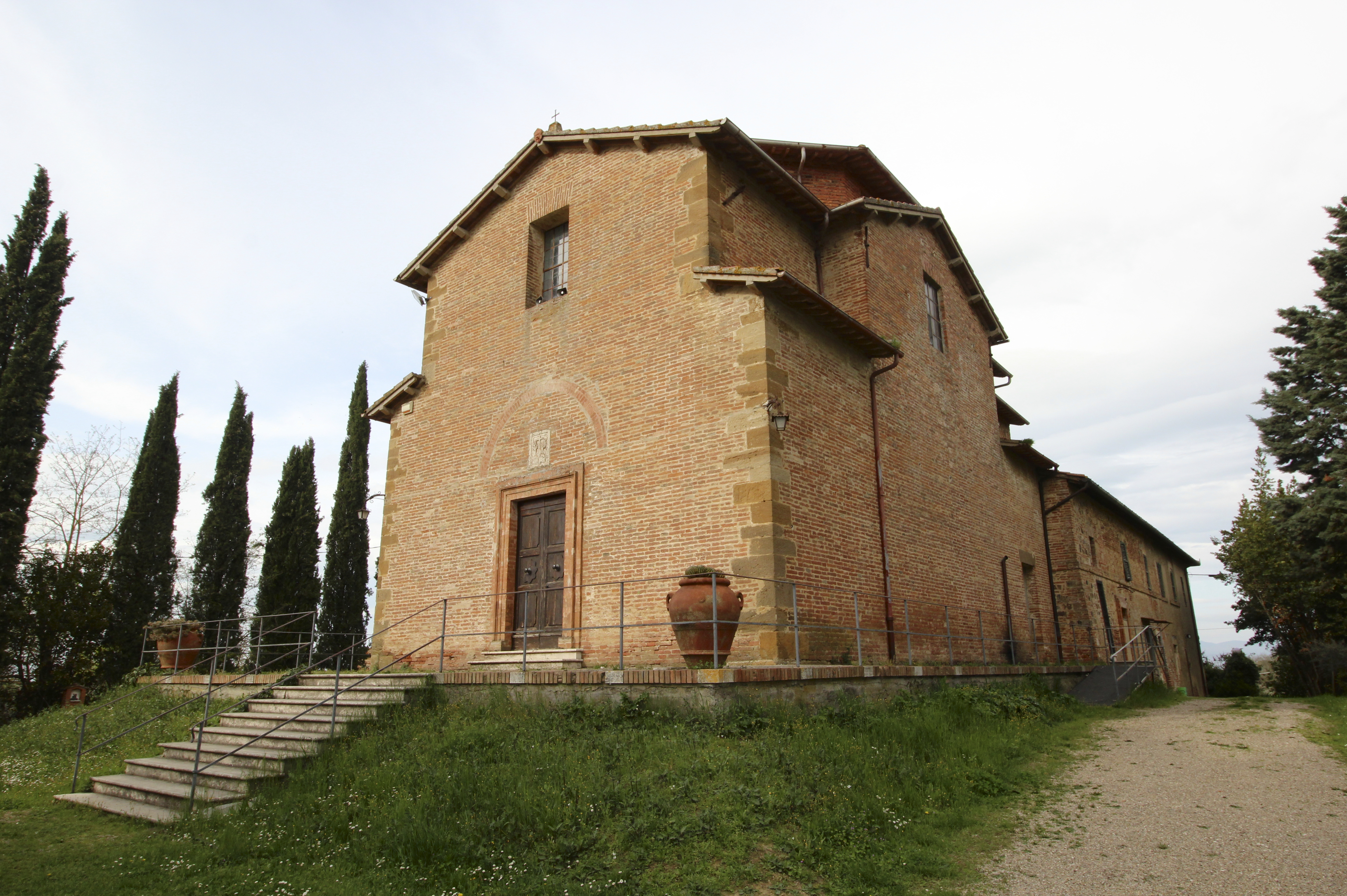
Sant'Ansano

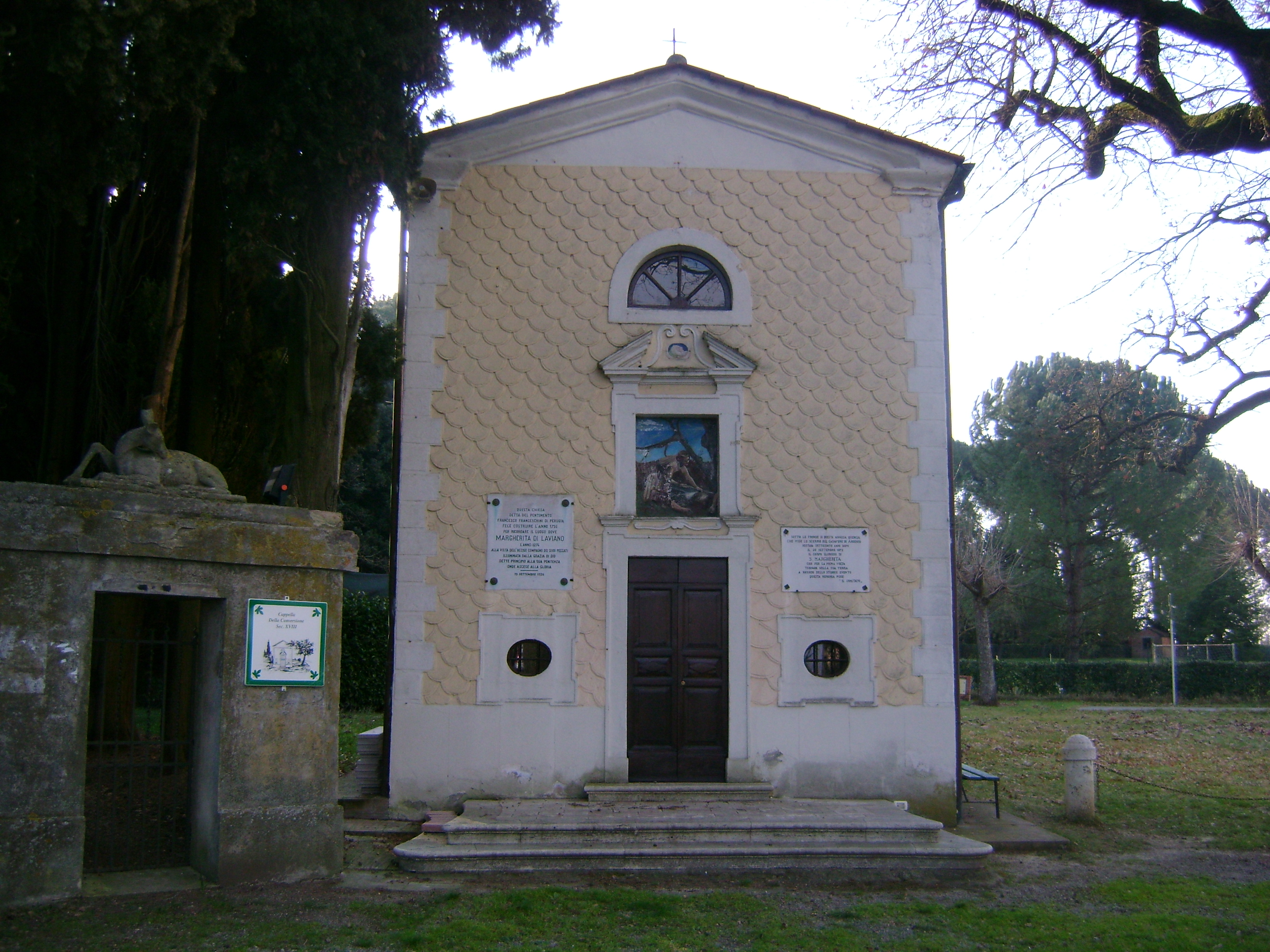
Santa Margherita da Cortona (Località Giorgi)
