= Castiglione del Lago =

- Comune
- Comune di Castiglione del Lago
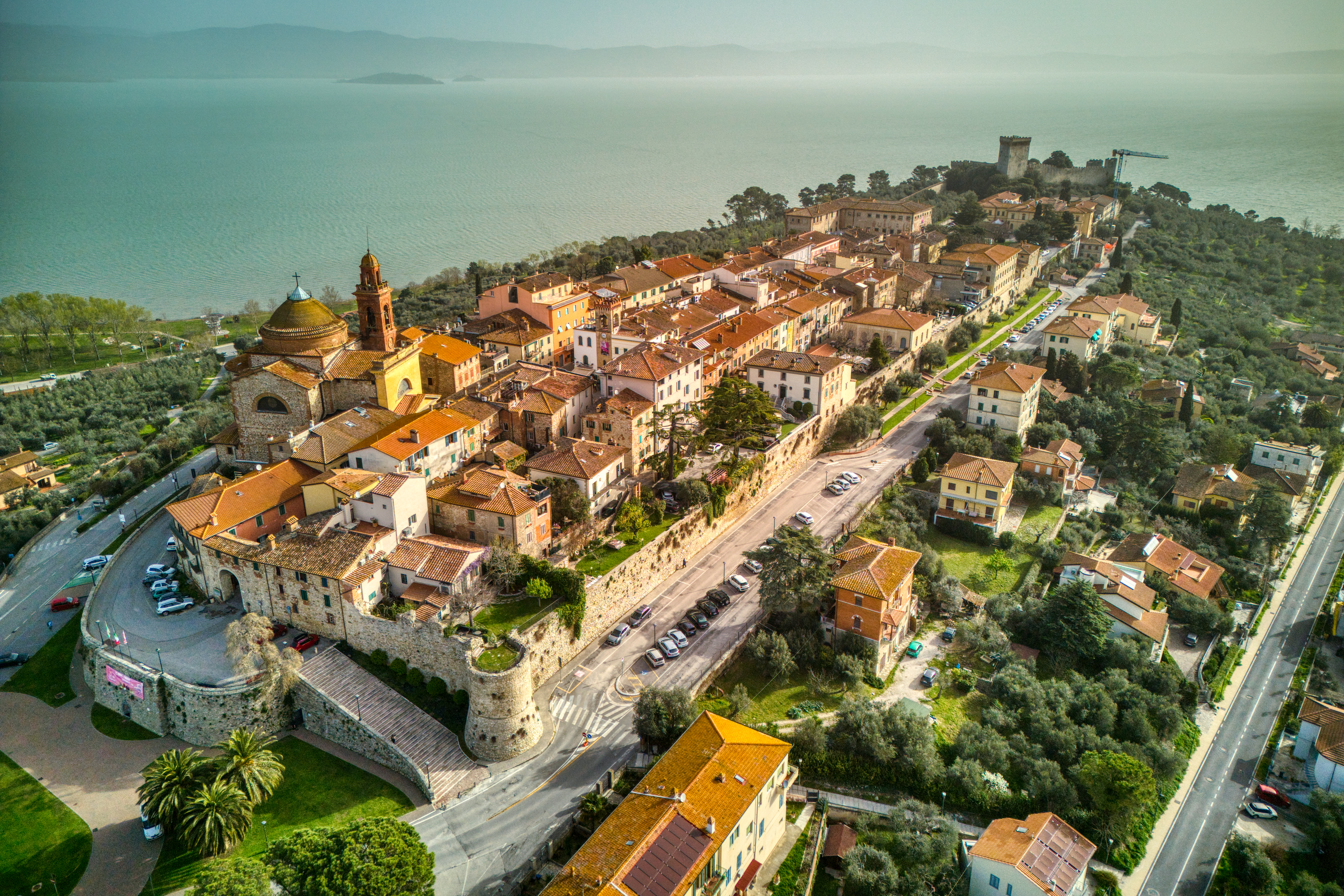
- Old town of Castiglione del Lago

- Coat of arms

- Location within Italy Location within Umbria
- Coordinates: 43.12764°N 12.053462°E
- Country: Italy
- Region: Umbria
- Province: Perugia

Government
  - Mayor: Matteo Burico

Area
  - Total: 205.26 km^{2} (79.25 sq mi)
- Elevation: 304 m (997 ft)

Population (1 January 2025)
  - Total: 15,173
  - Density: 73.921/km^{2} (191.45/sq mi)
- Demonym: Castiglionesi
- Time zone: UTC+1 (CET)
  - Summer (DST): UTC+2 (CEST)
- Postal code: 06061
- Dialing code: 075
- Patron saint: Mary Magdalene
- Saint day: 22 July
- Website: Official website

Castiglione del Lago is a town in the province of Perugia of Umbria (central Italy), on the southwest corner of Lake Trasimeno.

Castiglione del Lago is 59 km (37 mi) north of Orvieto, 21 km (13 mi) northeast of Chiusi, 56 km (35 mi) southeast of Arezzo, 21 km (13 mi) south of Cortona, and 47 km (29 mi) northwest of Perugia.

== Etymology ==
The town was originally known as Clusium Novum, having been settled by Etruscans from nearby Clusium. It then assumed the name Castiglione del Lago, being situated on the western shore of Lake Trasimeno.

== History ==
=== Antiquity ===
Castiglione del Lago stands on a hill that in antiquity formed the fourth island of Lake Trasimeno, before the strip of water separating it from the mainland was filled in.

In the 6th century BC, Etruscans from nearby Clusium settled the area. The site was known as Clusium Novum. Its position on a borderland made it a frequent setting for conflict: first fighting between Etruscans and Romans, and later between Tuscan towns and Perugia. Over time its defensive works were repeatedly destroyed and rebuilt.

A settlement of notable importance developed here, as evidenced by a large necropolis in the Vaiano district and another burial ground discovered near Villa Strada, at a place called the Comunaglie di Cimbano, where tombs yielded vases, weapons, bronzes, sarcophagi and other objects of Etruscan art.

=== Middle Ages ===
In the early Middle Ages, Lake Trasimeno marked the boundary between Lombards and Byzantines. The Byzantines built a large church on the former Etruscan acropolis, dedicating it to Saints James and Philip.

In 996 Otto III ceded it to Hugh, Margrave of Tuscany. According to other accounts, Otto III made Castiglione a fief of the Monks of Saint Januarius of Campolona. After 1000 the settlement was fortified several times in order to control the road leading from Rome and Orvieto toward Arezzo and Florence. Around this time, the town's name evolved from Castiglione Chiusino to Castiglione del Lago.

In 1091 Henry IV destroyed and burned it. In 1187, by grant made by Abbot Hugh, the Perugians obtained it, though they had to reconquer it because the local population resented the transfer. In 1212 Pope Innocent III confirmed it to Perugia. Even so, it was often contested by Cortona, Orvieto, and Arezzo; it also became involved with Orvieto once Orvieto obtained lordship over Chiusi, in whose diocese Castiglione del Lago was included.

In the mid-13th century, Emperor Frederick II built the large walls that encircle the older urban core.

In the 14th century Castiglione del Lago underwent further changes of control, with governments shifting as authority passed between the Church and the Empire. During Perugian civil wars, the Oddi, proscribed by the Baglioni, found refuge there, though they soon had to withdraw.

=== Early modern period ===
In the early 15th century Castiglione del Lago was a property of the Apostolic Camera. In 1515 Pope Leo X stayed in Castiglione del Lago while travelling from Rome to Florence, indicating that the main Chiusian route still passed through the area, linking Tuscany with Perugia.

In 1550 Pope Julius III granted the town to his sister Jacoma and to his nephews Ascanio della Corgna.

In 1616 Pope Paul V raised the fief to a duchy in favor of Fulvio della Corgna. The Palazzo della Corgna was built during this period. The House of della Corgna, first as marquises and later as dukes, ruled until 1647. During this period the town center was reshaped with small houses aligned along two main streets, an urban layout that remains in place.

After a poorly sustained siege in 1643, and amid suspicion of secret dealings with the enemy, the della Corgna lost their rights and Castiglione was incorporated into the Papal State.

=== Contemporary period ===
During the Napoleonic period Castiglione del Lago was the seat of a canton within the Napoleonic Empire. On 6 July 1816 Pope Pius VII listed it as a community with a resident governor, under the Delegation of Perugia.

In the mid-19th century Castiglione had 6,085 inhabitants, with 1,047 in the main built-up area and 5,038 in the countryside.

On 19 October 1860 it joined the newly unified Italian state by vote.

== Geography ==
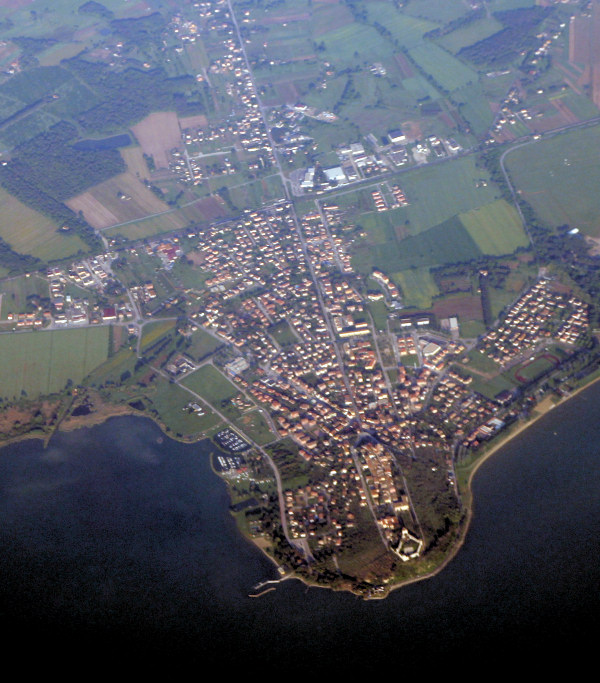
Aerial view

Castiglione del Lago lies between Monte Zecchiano, Città della Pieve, and Cortona, on a low hill on the western shore of Lake Trasimeno. The hill Castiglione stands on was once the fourth island of Lake Trasimeno. In antiquity it was separated from the mainland by a strip of water; it later became connected to the shore after that channel was filled in.

The climate is temperate, with north and southeast winds noted. The territory is described as humid because of the waters of the lake.

=== Subdivisions ===
The municipality includes the localities of Badia, Badiaccia, Banditella, Binami, Bracacci, Caioncola, Cantagallina, Carraia, Casamaggiore, Castiglione del Lago, Ceraso, Cimbano, Cozzano, Ferretto, Frattavecchia, Gioiella, I Bertoni, I Bologni, I Castagni, I Cuffi-Marchetti, I Giorgi, I Guidonami, I Lopi, I Nonni, I Poggi, Laviano, Macchie, Mecucciami, Muffa, Mugnanesi, Nardelli, Palazzetta, Panicarola, Pescia, Petrignano, Piana, Poggetto, Porto, Pozzuolo, Pucciarelli, Ranciano, Rigutini, San Fatucchio, Vaiano, Villastrada, Vitellino.

In 2021, 2,535 people lived in rural dispersed dwellings not assigned to any named locality. At the time, the most populous locality was Castiglione del Lago proper (5,658).

== Economy ==
In the 19th century, the territory of Castiglione was described as fertile in wine, oil and cereals, and as producing abundant timber. Fishing in Lake Trasimeno was an important activity. The shores also produced large quantities of sedge, reeds, and other aquatic plants.

== Religion ==
Saint Matthew is the patron saint, and the popular feast is held in September.

=== Santa Maria Maddalena ===
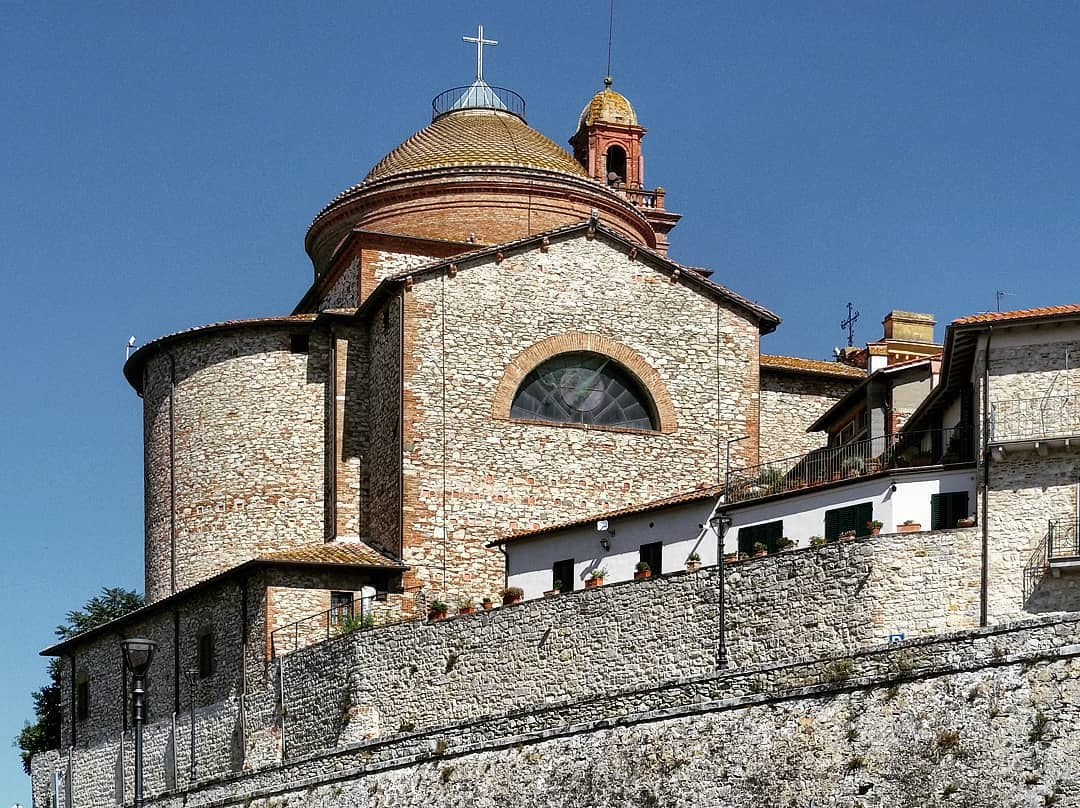
Church of Santa Maria Maddalena

The church of Santa Maria Maddalena serves as the principal church. The summit of its bell tower rises 329 metres (1,079 ft) above sea level.

The church has, on the first altar of the right wall, a fresco from the school of Giotto depicting Mary with the infant Jesus. In the sacristy a tempera panel is kept showing the Madonna and Child enthroned, surrounded by various saints and angels; it bears the date 1500 and is given as a work of the Perugian school.

=== Sanctuary of the Madonna della Carraia ===
The sanctuary of the Madonna della Carraia was built in the second half of the 17th century following a miraculous event dated to around 1659. In 1660 the bishop of Città della Pieve, then the relevant diocese, granted permission to build the church on the site of a sacred roadside shrine bearing an image of the Virgin.

The sanctuary has a Greek-cross plan, with brick pilasters and pietra serena pediments, a 19th-century dome, and a fan-shaped bell gable. Construction was completed in 1835. The sanctuary has a small central dome, three altars, and an organ.

=== Santi Apostoli Pietro e Paolo ===
The parish church of Santi Apostoli Pietro e Paolo at Pozzuolo stands on a small hill southeast of the village and was rebuilt in 1760 according to the design of Tiroli. It is noted as rich in stuccoes by Cremona and preserves an ancient baptismal font, linked to the baptism of Saint Margaret of Cortona, who is said to have been born at Laviano.

=== Santa Margherita di Cortona ===
The church of Santa Margherita da Cortona, also called the Conversione, stands about 1.5 miles (2.4 km) northwest of Pozzuolo. It was built in the 18th century by a devotee of the saint at the place where the miracle of the dog is said to have occurred, when the animal revealed to Saint Margaret the body of her lover Arsenio Cantucci of Montepulciano.

== Culture ==
=== Palazzo della Corgna ===
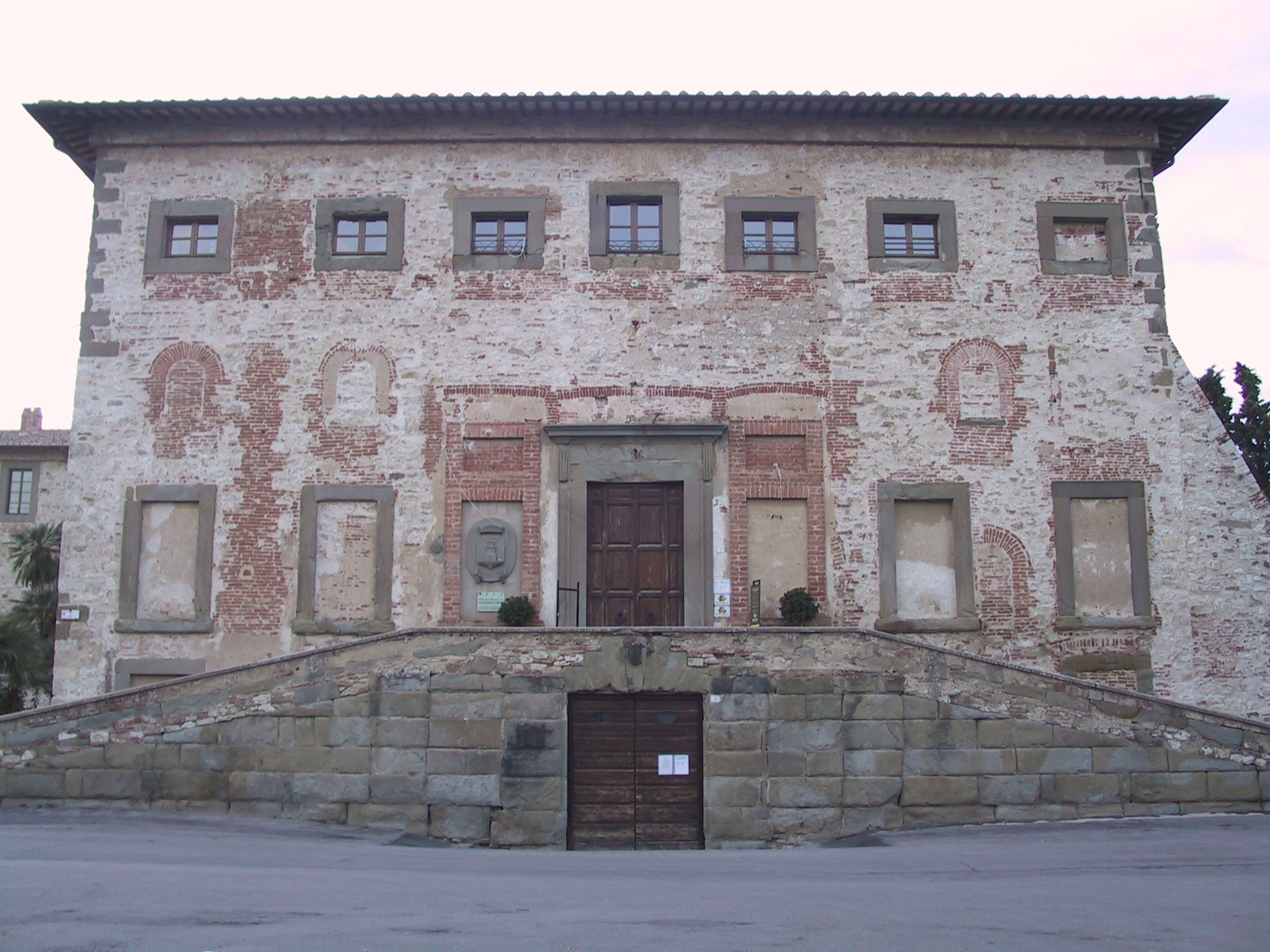
Palazzo della Corgna

Palazzo della Corgna is a 16th-century building, connected by a covered walkway to the medieval fortress overlooking Lake Trasimeno. The palace originated as a hunting lodge of the Baglioni family and was later adapted by Ascanio della Corgna as a residence for his family. It currently houses the municipality of Castiglione del Lago and the palace museum.

Construction began in 1563 after Pope Julius II granted the State of Castiglione to the della Corgna family, with the project carried out by Galeazzo Alessi and Vignola. The building has an L-shaped plan. The main façade features a raised entrance reached by a double flight of stairs, and a smaller wing set back to the left has regular rectangular openings. Between the two wings lies what remains of what was once a large Italian garden.

The interiors are extensively decorated with painted schemes by artists including Niccolò Circignani and Antonio Pandolfi. The ground floor, divided into three rooms, has frescoes with playful themes. The piano nobile, reached directly from the stairway, was used as Ascanio della Corgna's; its rooms include cycles intended to celebrate the family. Diomede della Penna, Ascanio's nephew, had the walls frescoed with his uncle's military and political ventures, presented in sixteen trompe-l'oeil tapestries on the walls and in a large ceiling composition.

=== Rocca del Leone ===
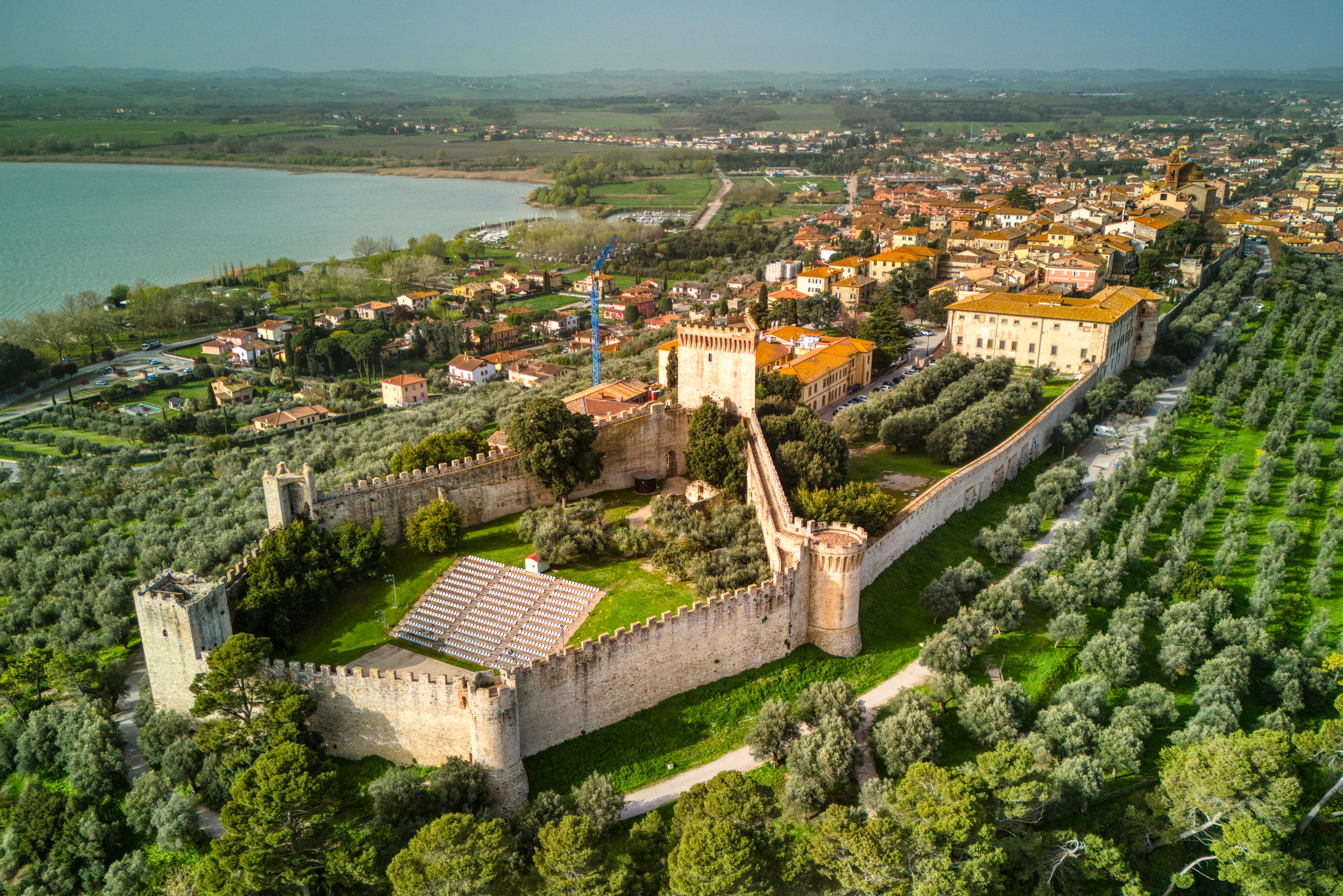
Rocca del Leone

Rocca del Leone is a fortress dating to the 12th century within the built-up area of Castiglione del Lago, dominating the eastern part of the settlement The current structure has the form of an irregular pentagon with Guelph-style crenellated walls, defended at the main corners by four towers; inside the perimeter stands a triangular keep more than 30 metres (98 ft) high. The name is linked to an earlier Castello del Leone and to the subsequent evolution of the place name.

Work on the fortress began at the start of the 12th century, during the reign of Frederick II of Swabia, as part of a central defensive system crossing Italy. At the end of the 12th century, during the war between Perugia and Arezzo, the earlier Castello del Leone was reduced to ruins by Henry IV.

In 1297 Perugian magistrates decided to fortify the settlement and build a fortress within the castle area, creating the Rocca. Further interventions were carried out in the 14th century by Friar Elia Coppi of Cortona and the Sienese architect Lorenzo Maitani. The fortress underwent attacks throughout the 14th and 15th centuries until Giampaolo Baglioni established his residence there in 1503 and later ordered restoration and expansion. An additional stretch of wall was built, partly still visible, running from the palace toward the area near the keep; access to the keep used wooden stairs set on landings that could be withdrawn during an attack.

In 1550 Pope Julius III elevated the place to a marquisate and assigned jurisdiction to his sister and to his nephew Ascanio I della Corgna. In 1554 Ascanio I created Italian-style gardens inside the walls and replaced two towers with cylindrical bastions, intended to provide greater security after the appearance of cannons; he also had a lordly palace built by restoring 14th-century buildings, apparently to a design by Vignola.

In 1623 a painting was hung on the castle walls depicting the Duke della Corgna as a traitor, hanged by one foot, accompanied by an inscription naming Fulvio della Corgna of Perugia as excommunicate, rebel and traitor for having delivered Castiglione del Lago into enemy hands. The castle serves as the municipal residence, and its tower is noted as a viewpoint over the lake, its islands, and the mountains of the Aretine and Perugian areas.

The fortress remained in the hands of the della Corgna family until the death of Fulvio II in 1647, then passed under the jurisdiction of the Apostolic Camera.

=== Archeology ===
The monumental ancient Roman "Gioiella-Vaiano" villa (between the villages of Gioiella and Vaiano) was excavated in 2016-9 and was a large complex for both pleasure (otium) and production (negotium). It was built on up to three terraces on the slope of the hill overlooking Lago di Chiusi. It dates from the 2nd century BC to the early 4th century AD and flourished during the early imperial period, its owners probably having links to the Imperial family. The Villa underwent several structural modifications with several owners. Excavations have revealed a luxurious bath complex tiled with marble and with glass windows, on the lower terrace, and a monumental nymphaeum on the central terrace from the early imperial phase of the villa. The nymphaeum was designed to impress visitors with the control and display of water, of a standard found in the most luxurious villas on the Bay of Naples. It was built around a large vaulted space over a pool with 12 niches in the walls decorated with blue glass to reflect the water below and to imitate a grotto.

=== Events ===
Every two years, Castiglione del Lago is the host of the Coloriamo i Cieli festival. The "Colour the Skies" event is held on no fixed date in late April or May. Since 2005, however, this festival has been held annually and now includes light aircraft (nearly 2000 in 2007), hot air balloons (17) and thousands of multi coloured kites.

== Notable people ==
- Saint Margaret of Cortona was born here in 1247
- Andrea Antonelli, a World Supersport rider and native of Castiglione del Lago, died in a crash at the Moscow Raceway in 2013.
- Stefano Okaka, born in 1989, football player

== Twin towns ==
- Trappes, France, since 1971
- Kopřivnice, Czech Republic, since 1997
- Lempäälä, Finland, since 2005
