= San Fatucchio =

- Frazione
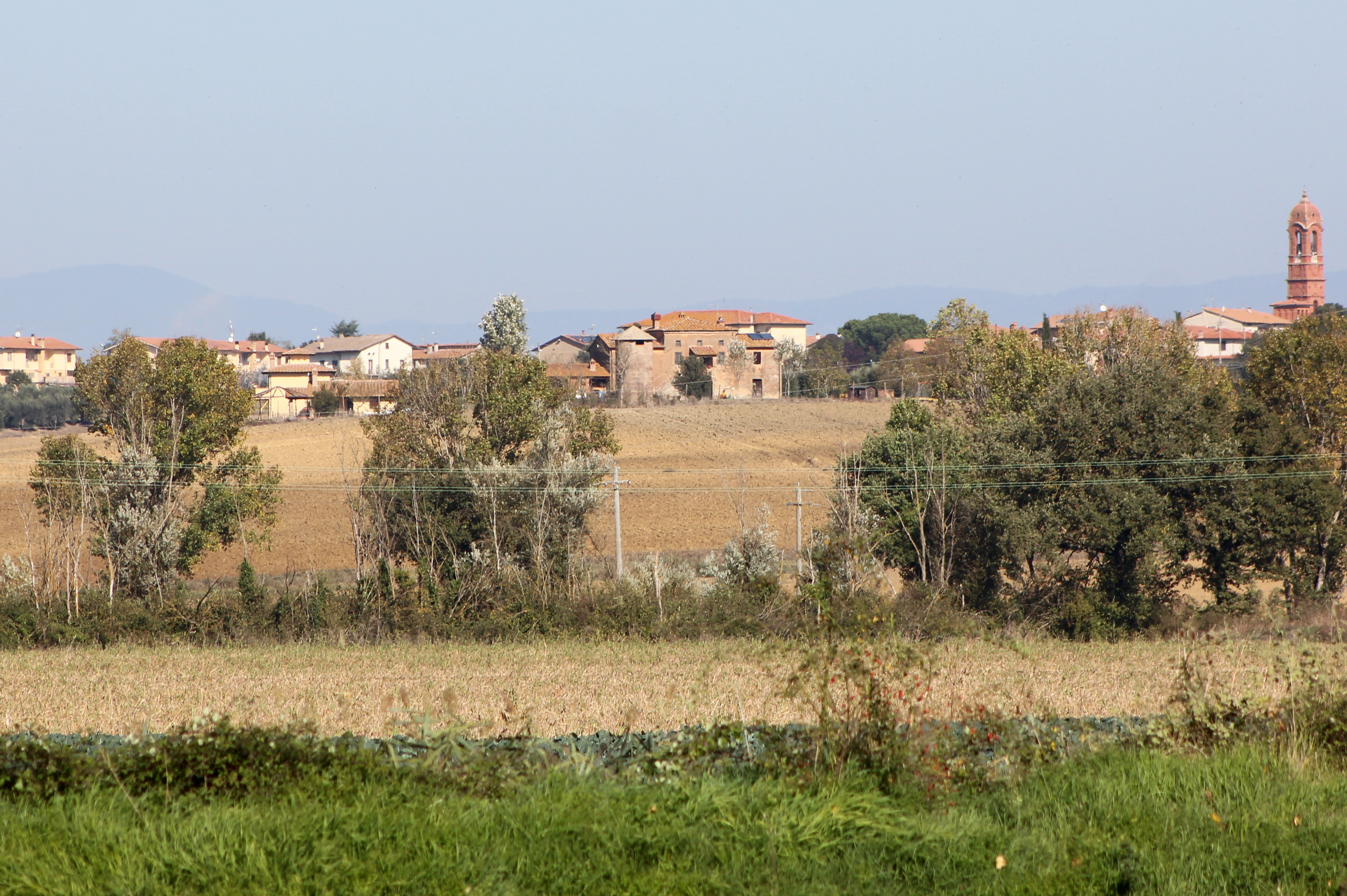
- San Fatucchio

- Location within Italy
- Coordinates: 43°04′38″N 12°03′06″E
- Country: Italy
- Region: Umbria
- Province: Perugia
- Comune: Castiglione del Lago
- Elevation: 301 m (988 ft)

Population (2001)
  - Total: 644
- Time zone: UTC+1 (CET)
  - Summer (DST): UTC+2 (CEST)
- Postcode: 06061
- Area code: 075

San Fatucchio (also Sanfatuccio) is a frazione of the comune of Castiglione del Lago in the Province of Perugia, Umbria, central Italy. It stands at an elevation of 301 metres above sea level. At the time of the Istat census of 2001 it had 644 inhabitants.

Churches in San Fatucchio

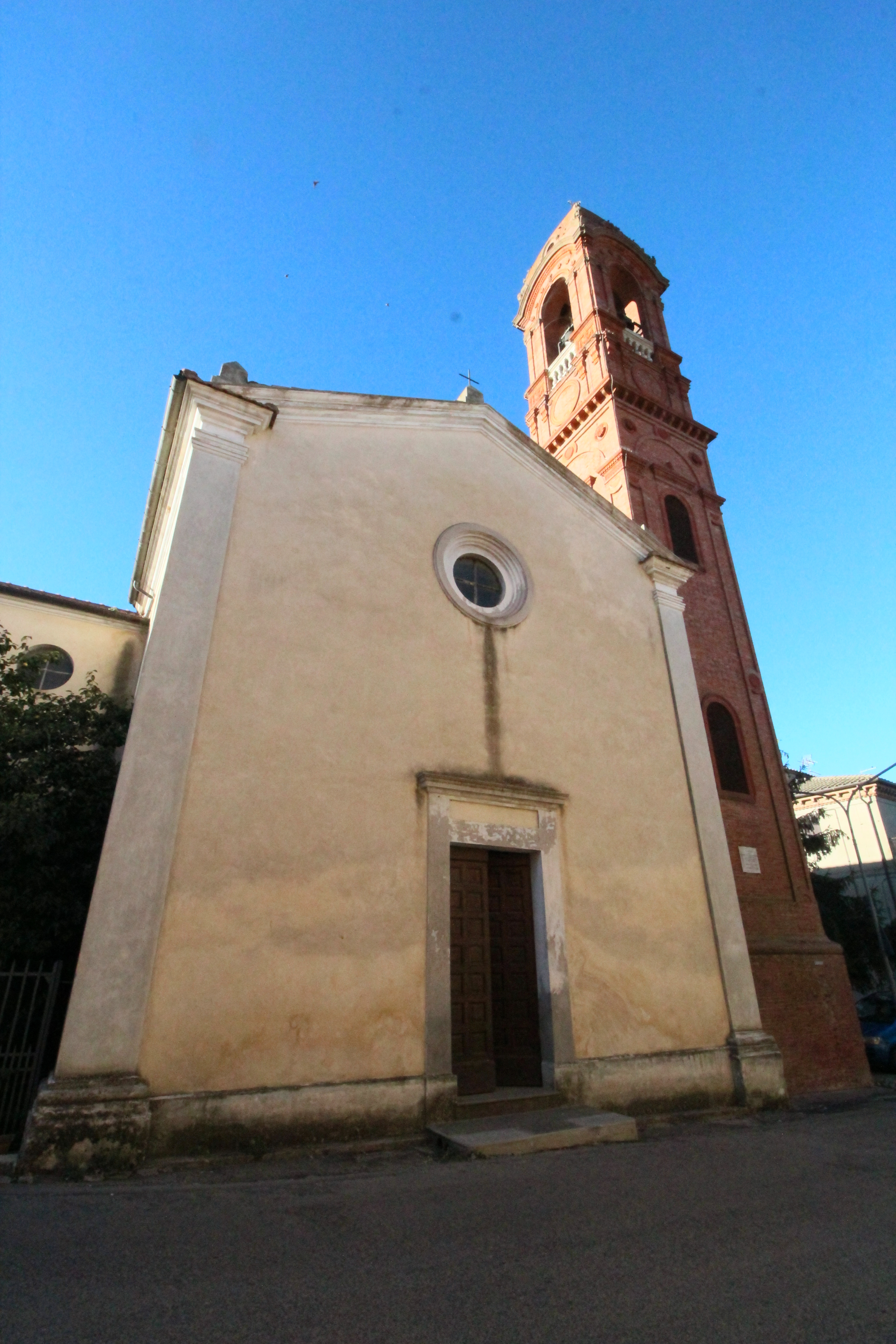
Santa Maria delle Grazie

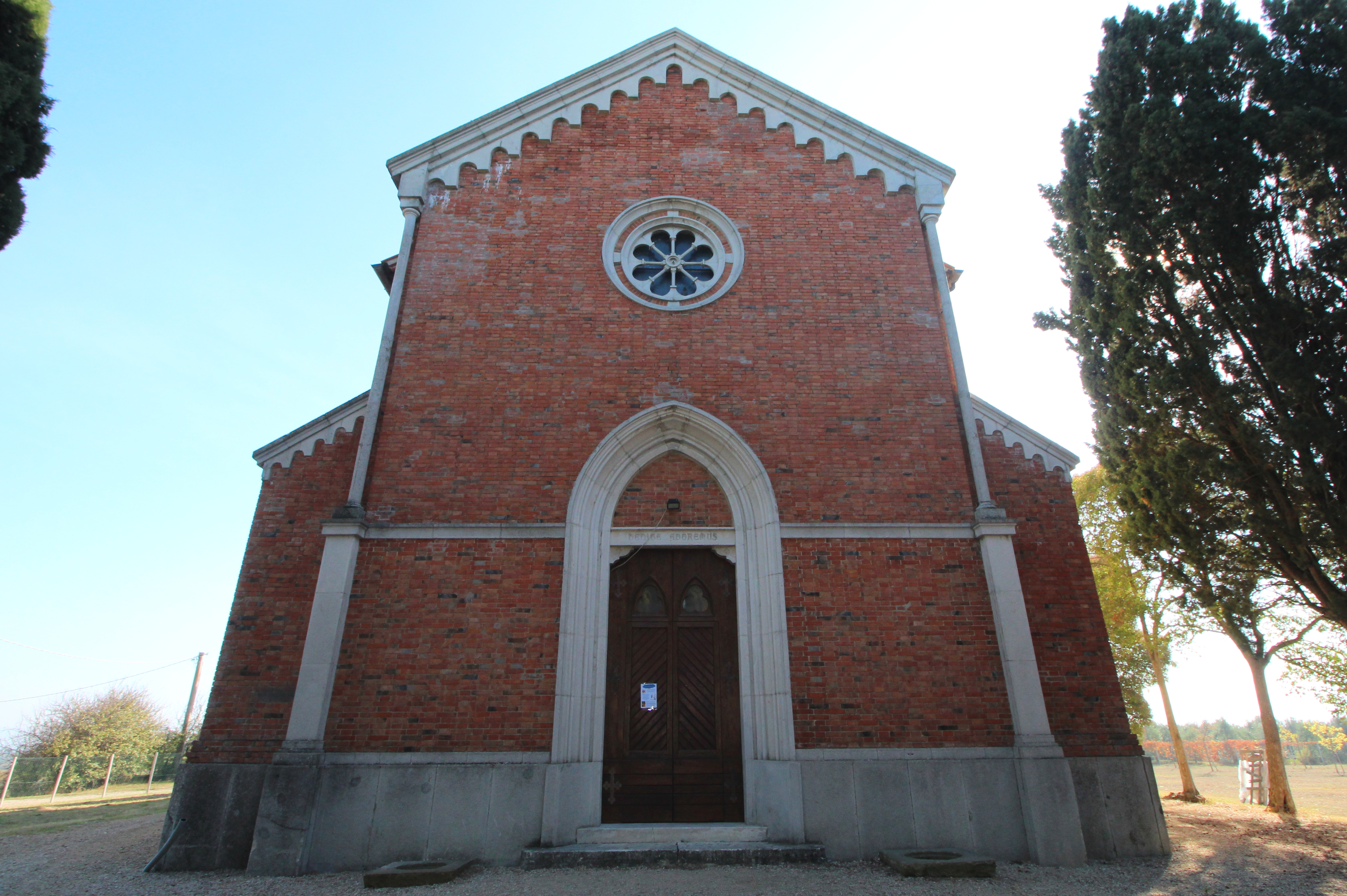
San Felice
