= Panicarola =

- Frazione
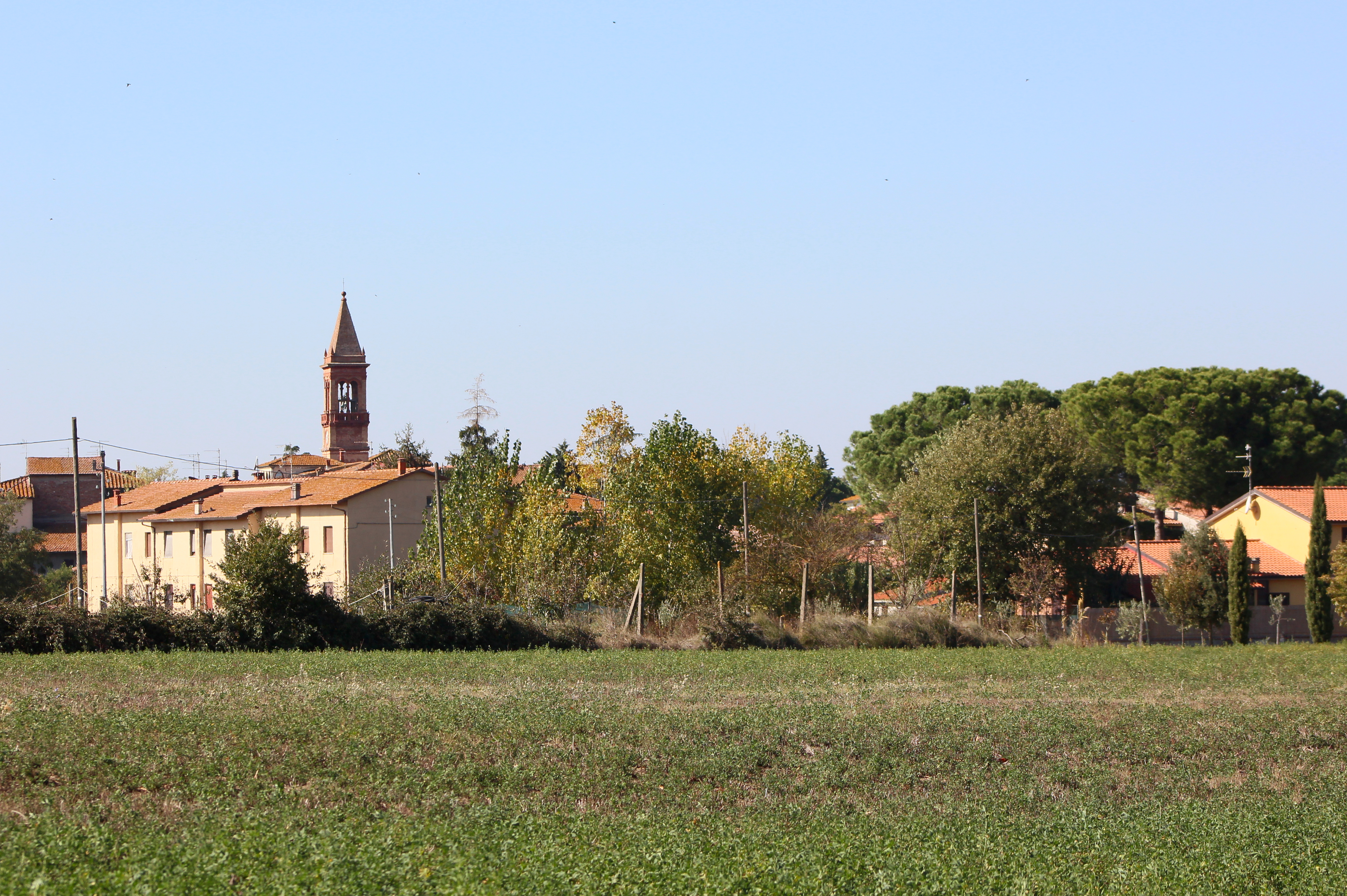
- Panicarola

- Location within Italy
- Coordinates: 43°04′15″N 12°05′12″E
- Country: Italy
- Region: Umbria
- Province: Perugia
- Comune: Castiglione del Lago
- Elevation: 269 m (883 ft)

Population (2001)
  - Total: 760
- Time zone: UTC+1 (CET)
  - Summer (DST): UTC+2 (CEST)
- Postcode: 06061
- Area code: 075

Panicarola is a frazione of the comune of Castiglione del Lago in the Province of Perugia, Umbria, central Italy. It stands at an elevation of 269 metres above sea level. At the time of the Istat census of 2001 it had 760 inhabitants.

Churches in Panicarola

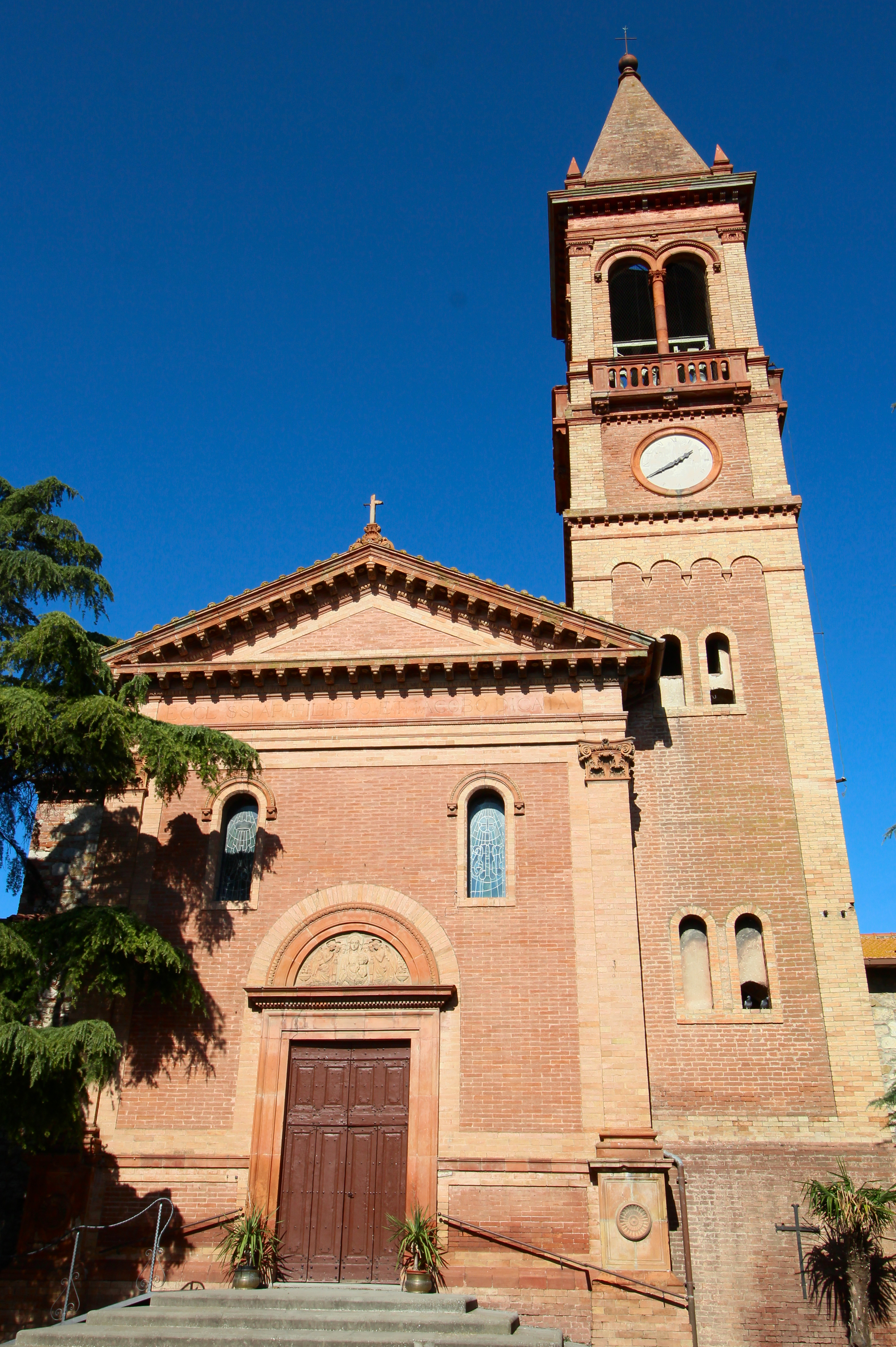
Santi Filippo e Giacomo

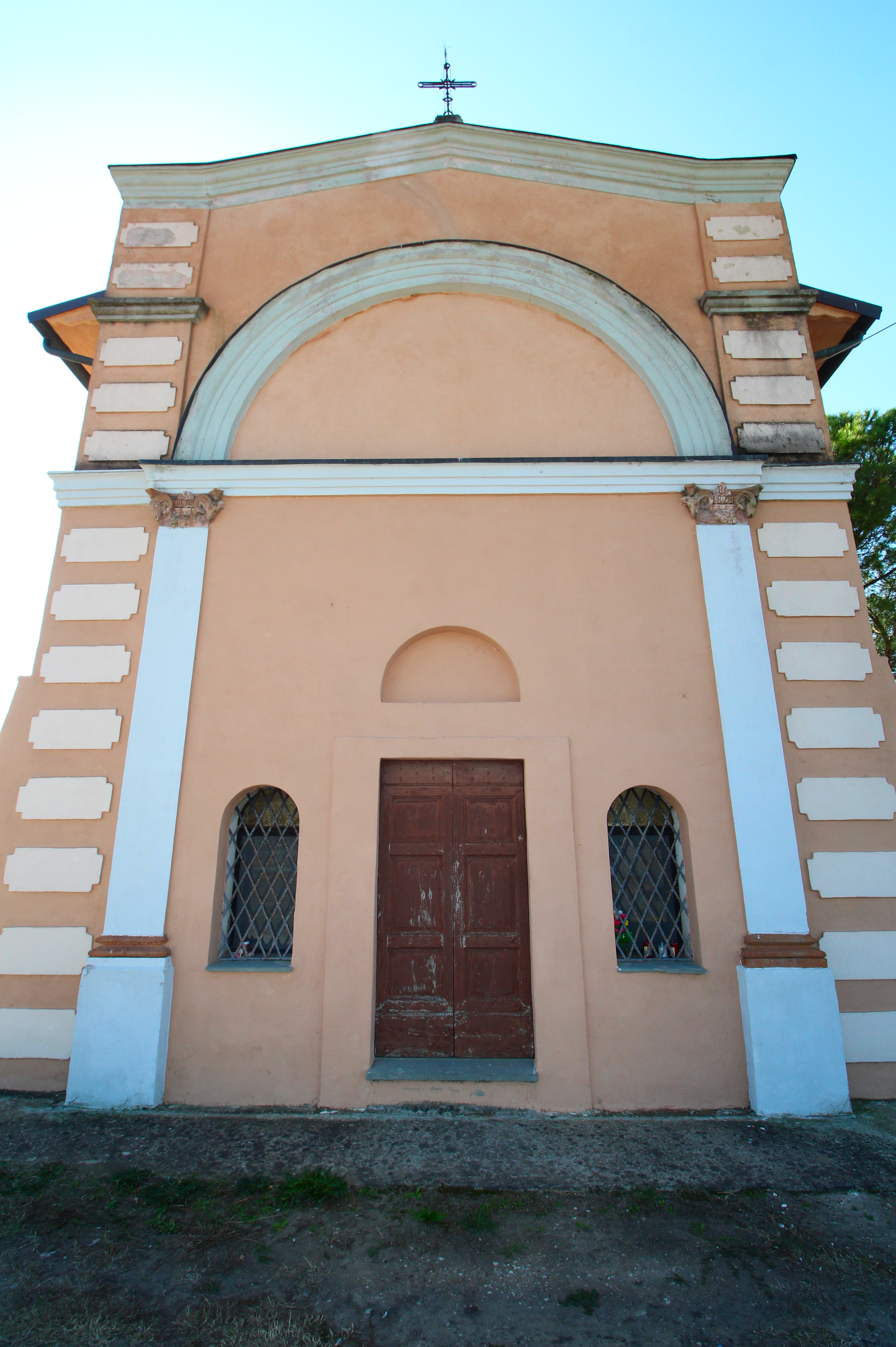
Madonna del Busso

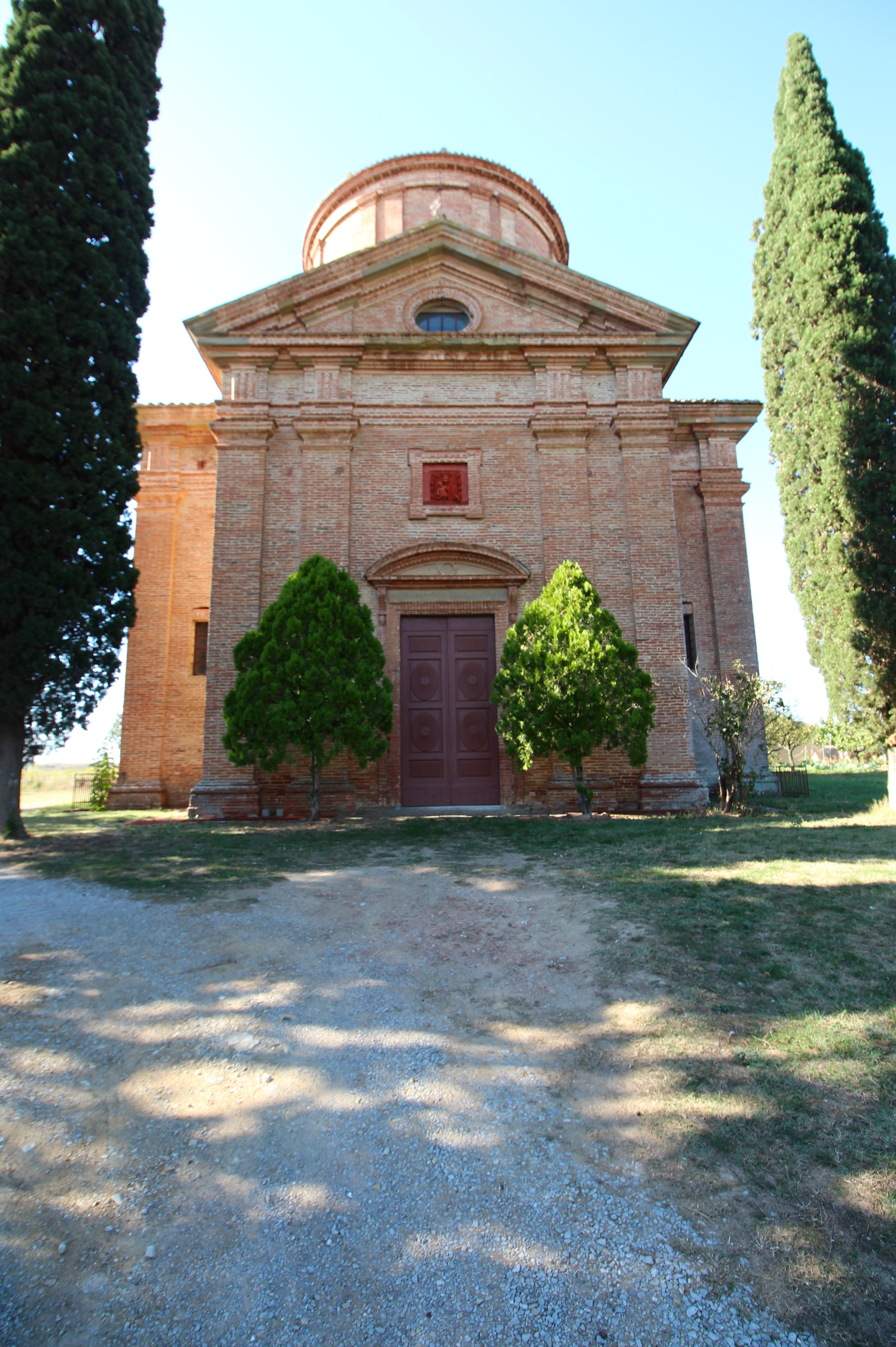
Madonna della Carraia (Località Carraia)
