= Piana, Perugia =

Piana
- Frazione
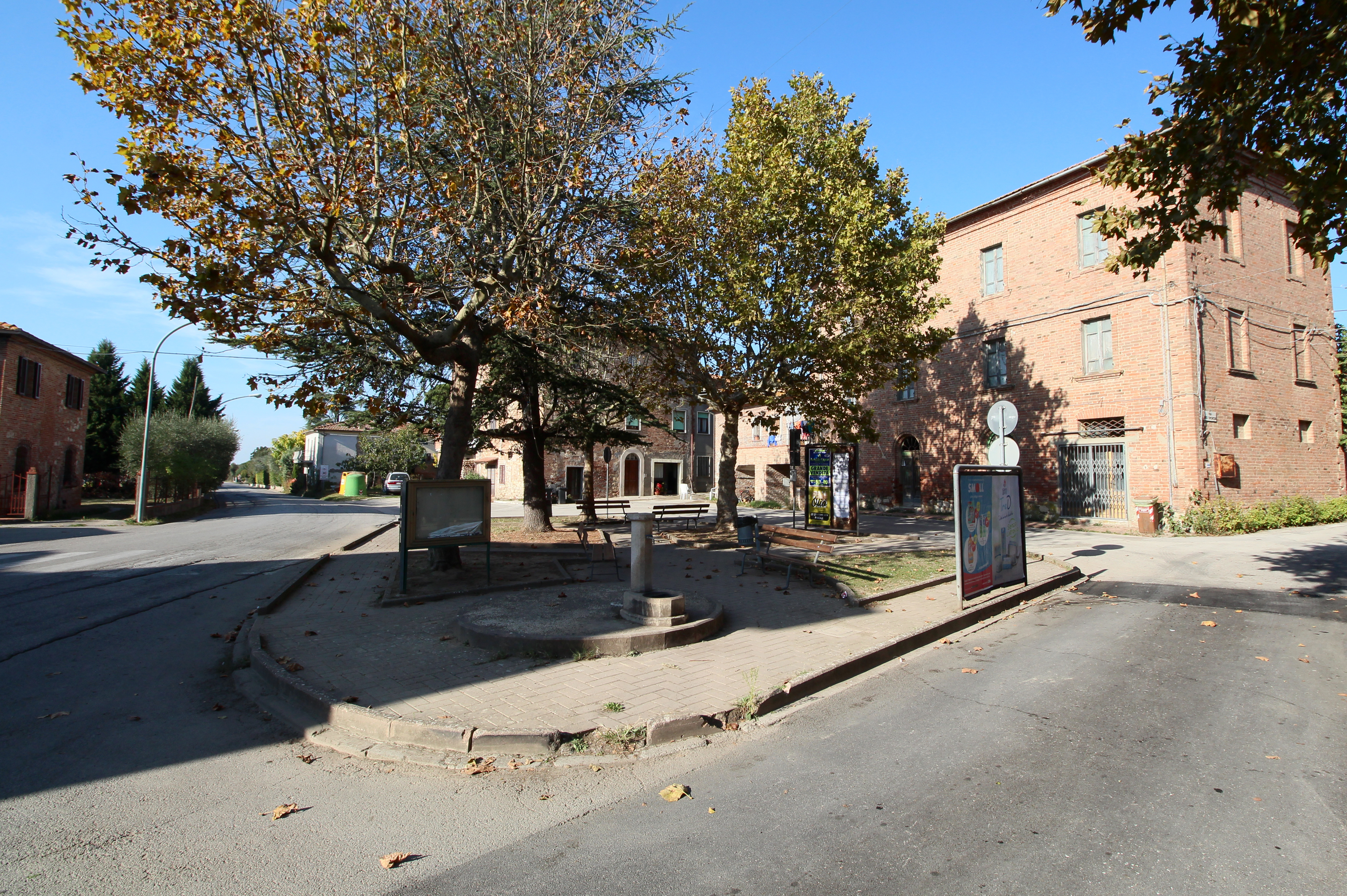
- Piana

- Location within Italy
- Coordinates: 43°08′20″N 12°00′35″E
- Country: Italy
- Region: Umbria
- Province: Perugia
- Comune: Castiglione del Lago
- Elevation: 277 m (909 ft)

Population (2001)
  - Total: 206
- Time zone: UTC+1 (CET)
  - Summer (DST): UTC+2 (CEST)
- Postcode: 06061
- Area code: 075

Piana is a frazione of the comune of Castiglione del Lago in the Province of Perugia, Umbria, central Italy. It stands at an elevation of 277 metres above sea level. At the time of the Istat census of 2001 it had 206 inhabitants.

Churches in Piana

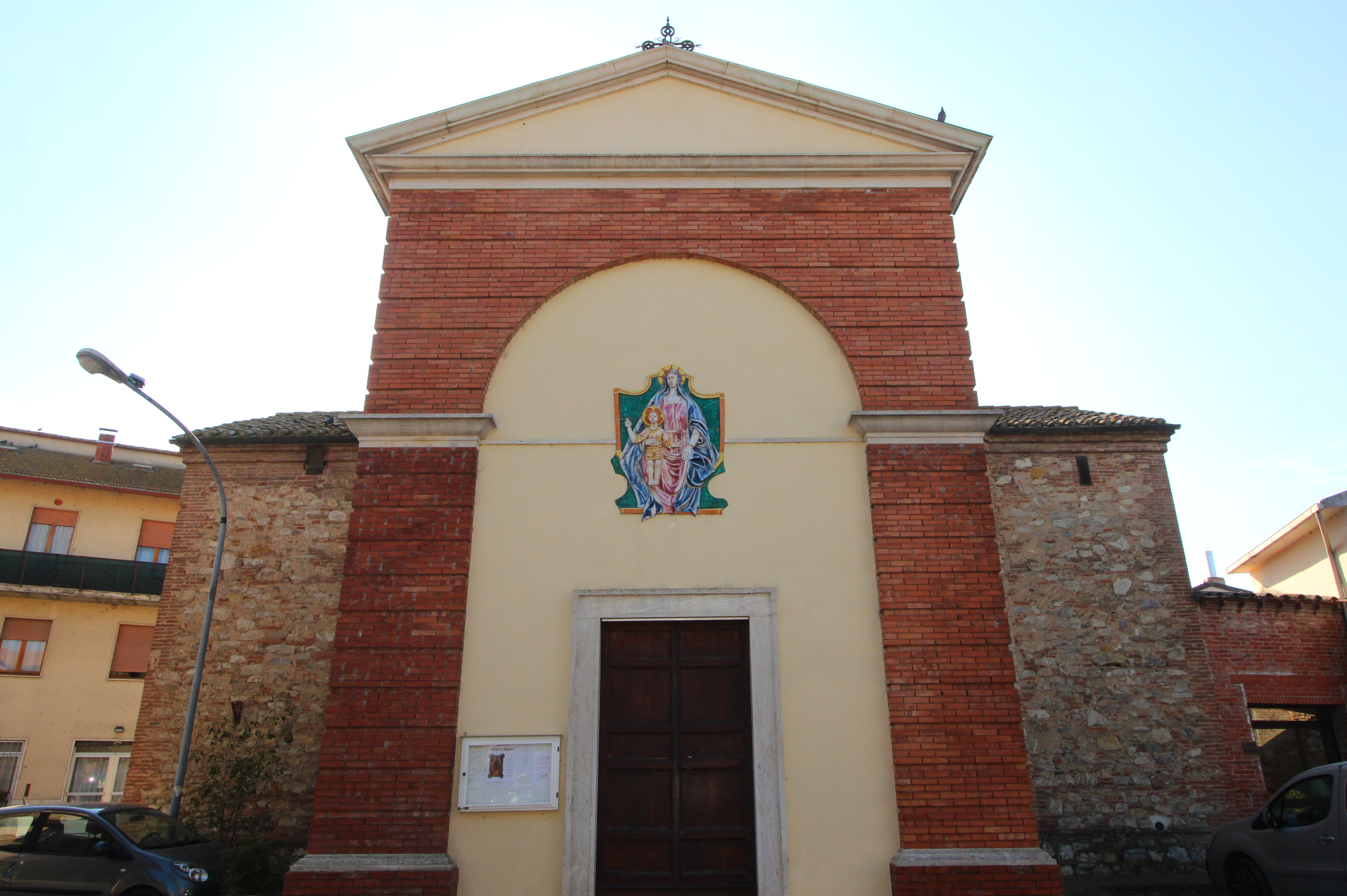
Santa Maria (Madonna della Rosa)

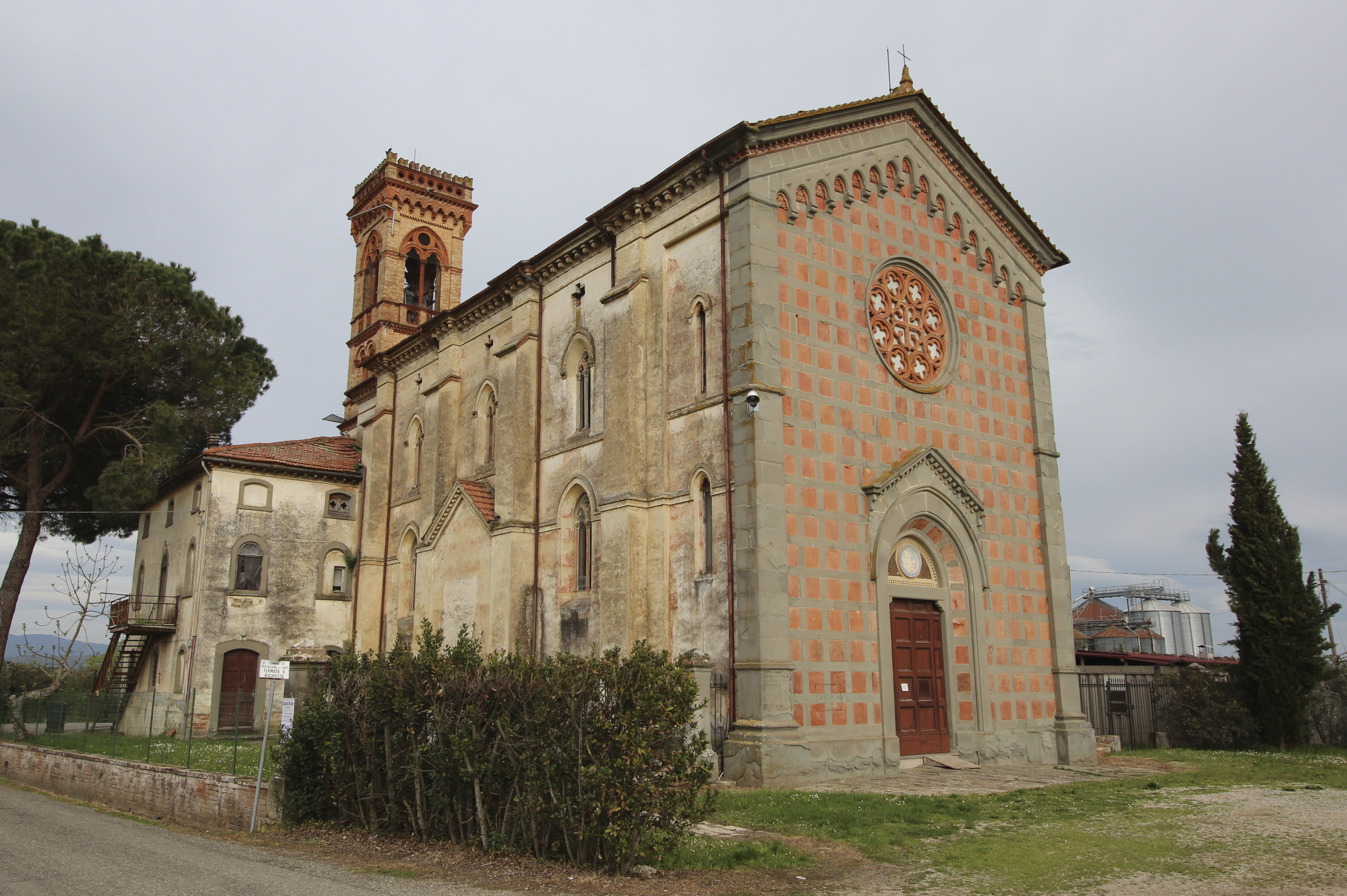
San Giovanni Battista (località Ferretto)
