= Pianoforte (disambiguation) =

Pianoforte or piano is a keyboard musical instrument. It may also refer to:

- Pianoforte (1984 film), an Italian drama film
- Pianoforte (2023 film), a Polish documentary
- Pianoforte (Vivier), the musical composition
- PianoForte Foundation

== See also ==
- Fortepiano, an early piano
