= Pianist (disambiguation) =

A pianist is someone who plays the piano.

Pianist or the pianist may also refer to:

== Films and soundtracks ==
- The Pianist (1991 film), a Canadian film directed by Claude Gagnon
- The Pianist (1998 film), a Catalan-language film directed by Mario Gas, titled El Pianista in Catalan
- The Piano Teacher (film), a French-language film by Michael Haneke, original title La Pianiste
- The Pianist (2002 film), an English-language movie directed by Roman Polanski, based on Szpilman's memoir
  - The Pianist (soundtrack), the soundtrack to Polanski's 2002 film

== Other arts, entertainment, and media ==
- The Pianist (album), an album by Duke Ellington
- The Pianist (memoir), by Władysław Szpilman, a Polish-Jewish musician who survived the Holocaust
- The Pianist (painting), a portrait of Stanley Addicks by Thomas Eakins
- Pianist (KBS Drama Special), a 2010 South Korean single-episode drama
