= Grand Piano (disambiguation) =

A grand piano is a type of piano in which the frame and strings are horizontal.

Grand Piano may also refer to:

- The Grand Piano, a 1942 novel within Paul Goodman's The Empire City epic novel tetralogy
- Grand Piano (album), a 1985 album by George Shearing
- Grand Piano (film), a 2013 thriller film directed by Eugenio Mira
- Grand Piano (Narada Anniversary Collection), a 1997 compilation release by Narada
- "Grand Piano", a song on the 2014 Nicki Minaj album The Pinkprint
- Grand Piano, a record label owned by Naxos
