= Lione Pascoli =

Italian abbot, art historian, art collector, and economist

- Portrait of Lione Pascoli, Pinacoteca Comunale, Deruta
- Born: 3 May 1674; Perugia, Papal States
- Died: 30 July 1744 (aged 70); Rome, Papal States
- Education: Roman College
- Occupations: Abbot, art historian, collector, and economist
- Known for: Vite de’ pittori, scultori ed architetti moderni (1730–36)

Lione Pascoli (3 May 1674 – 30 July 1744) was an Italian abbot, art historian, collector, and economist.

== Biography ==
=== Life and career ===
Lione Pascoli was born in Perugia, the fourth son of Giandomenico Pascoli and Maria Ippolita Mariottini. At the age of 16, he moved to Rome, where he completed his studies in canon and civil law. At the beginning of the 17th century, he was appointed secretary to the Sacred Rota and established close ties with prominent members of the Roman Curia and of foreign diplomatic circles, in particular Cardinal Filippo Antonio Gualtieri, and the Duke of Uzeda, Juan Francisco Pacheco y Téllez-Girón, Spanish ambassador to the Holy See. In 1706, Pascoli was appointed apostolic protonotary in Ravenna.

Because of his connections with the Spanish ambassador, he became embroiled in diplomatic intrigue during the War of the Spanish Succession and decided to quit Italy and embark on a journey through Northern Europe. He visited Poland, the Netherlands, Vienna, England, and Paris. Upon his return to Perugia, he wrote Testamento politico d’un accademico fiorentino (The Political Testament of a Florentine Academician), a series of reflections on the civil progress of European nations. The work circulated widely in manuscript form since 1722, and was published anonymously in Perugia in 1733 with the support of Count Orazio Baglioni. The Testamento politico belongs to the tradition of 18th-century moderate reformism. Influenced by French economists such as Pierre Le Pesant, Pascoli promulgated a mix of protectionism and mercantilism, proposing the abolition of internal tariffs on agricultural products, and ban on the export of raw commodities and importationation of manufactured goods . His work influenced later reforms implemented by Pope Pius VI and the Grand-Duke of Tuscany, Peter Leopold.

A connoisseur with a broad interest in Renaissance and Baroque painting, Pascoli became a prominent collector of contemporary works of art. His collection included 281 paintings, mostly from the mid-17th to the early 18th centuries and ranging from works by the followers of Caravaggio to the late ones of Guido Reni. However, he had an overwhelming preference for the Roman school (including Sassoferrato, Pier Francesco Mola, Andrea Sacchi, Ciro Ferri and Giovanni Battista Gaulli). He favoured still lifes, battle scenes and genre paintings by the Flemish Bamboccianti.

Pascoli died in Rome on 30 July 1744. After his death, his heirs dispersed many of the works of his collection. About forty paintings form part of the collection of the Municipal Art Gallery of the town of Deruta, Umbria.

=== Main works ===
Title page of the second volume of Pascoli's Vite de’ pittori, scultori ed architetti moderni, Rome,1736

Pascoli's taste as a collector is perfectly reflected in his most important book on art, the Vite de’ pittori, scultori ed architetti moderni (1730–36), which focuses on modern painting of widely divergent styles. The 88 biographies, arranged roughly in chronological order, have no notable omissions except that of Bernini. While trying to follow a method of archival and other documentary verification that had been popularized by Carlo Cesare Malvasia, Girolamo Baruffaldi and others, some errors were, nevertheless, introduced by his casual reliance on secondary sources, especially the works of Giovanni Battista Passeri, Bellori and Baldinucci.

Caprice, modernity and genius are praised in the first volume of the Vite, while the second volume (1736) warns against the dangers of imagination and the need to follow the ancients. The shift to conservatism is clearest in his assessment of the modern style: in 1730 he recommended the 17th century as ‘a most happy age, perhaps the most fecund that painting has ever had,’ but by 1736 he came to see this fecundity no longer as a denotation of richness, diversity and growth but as one of cancerous proliferation.

Pascoli's second treatise on art. the Vite de’ pittori, scultori ed architetti viventi, is an unfinished continuation of the Vite de’ pittori, scultori ed architetti moderni. Like his earlier work, it emphasizes painting, but it includes only the most important artists. Pascoli used Nicola Pio's manuscript Le vite di pittori scultori et architetti (Cod. ms. Capponi 257) as a source, although his lives are much longer and always contain additional material.

Pascoli's last work, the Vite de’ pittori, scultori ed architetti perugini (1732) was an attempt to correct Vasari’s Tuscan bias by asserting the importance of his own local tradition. The work provides a biography of 68 artists who lived in the Umbrian city between 1250 and the 17th century and is an important source of information on the history of Renaissance and Baroque art.

== Writings ==
- Lione, Pascoli (1736). Vite de pittori, scultori, ed architetti moderni. Antonio de' Rossi, Strada del Seminario Romano, Rome.
- Lione, Pascoli (1732). Vite de pittori, scultori, ed architetti Perugini. Antonio de' Rossi, Strada del Seminario Romano, Rome.
- Lione, Pascoli (1740). Il Tevere Navigato, e Navigabile (The Tiber River, Navigated and Navigable). Antonio de' Rossi, vicino alla Rotonda, Rome.

== Perugian Artists Featured in Pascoli's Vite de’ Pittori, Scultori ed Architetti Perugini ==
- Bevignate (1250-1350) civil architect
- Benedetto Buonfigli (1420-1500) painter
- Pier Vincenzo Rinaldi (1440-1512) civil architect
- Pietro Vannucci (1446-1524) painter
- Bernardino Pintoricchio (1454-1513) painter
- Giovanni Gregori (1470-1510) military architect
- Giambatista Caporali (1475-1560) painter and civil and military architect
- Gìanniccola (1478-1540) painter
- Eusebio San Giorgio (1478-1550) painter
- Giovanni Battista Danti (1478-1517) military architect and failed aerialist
- Giordana Tassi (1482-1590) civil architect
- Domenico di Paris Alfani (1483-1520) painter
- Leandro Signorelli (Leonardo) (1490-1530) military architect
- Cesare Rossetti (1490-1550) painter, sculptor, and civil and military architect
- Orazio di Paris Alfani (1494-1556) painter
- Teodora Danti (1498-1573) painter
- Galeazzo Alessi (1500-1572) civil and military architect
- Giulio Danti (1500-1575) civil architect
- Mariano d'Eusterio (1500-1570) painter
- N. N. (1500-1559) engraver
- Girolamo Bigazzini (1501-1572) civil architect
- Giulio Caporali (1510-1580) painter and civil architect
- Ascanio della Corgna (1516-1571) civil and military architect
- Bernardino Sozi (1520-1550) civil architect
- Giandomenico Perugino (1520-1590) painter
- Pietro Cefarei (1530-1602) painter and illuminator
- Vincenzo Danti (1530-1576) painter and scultore
- Vincenzo Anastagi (1534-?) military architect
- Pellegrino Danti (1537-1586) painter and civil architect
- Girolamo Ruscelli (architect) (1538-1604) civil architect
- Valentino Martelli (1540-1600) sculptor and civil architect
- Girolamo Danti (1547-1580) painter
- Eusebio Bastoni (1550-1600) sculptor
- Diamante Egidi (1551-1607) military architect
- Benedetto Bandiera (1557-1634) painter
- Archita Ricci (1560-1635) painter
- Cesare Franchi (1560-1630) painter and illuminator
- Giovanni Antonio Scaramuccia (1580-1650) painter
- Stefano Amadei (1589-1644) painter
- Antonmaria Fabbrizzi (1594-1649) painter
- Fabio della Corgna (1600-1643) painter, and civil & military architect
- Giovanni Francesco Bassotti (1600-1665) painter
- Francesco Grotti (1604-1679) civil architect
- Giovanni Domenico Cerrini (1609-1681) painter
- Pietro Strappa (1610-1680) civil architect
- Paolo Gismondi (1610-1685) painter
- Ercolano Ercolanetti (1610-1687) painter
- Luigi Scaramuccia (1610-1680) painter
- Silvio Puccetti (1620-1675) painter
- Pietro Sanfelice (1620-1691) civil architect
- Giovanni Battista Mazzi (1622-1691) painter
- Annibale Leonzi (1622-1705) painter
- Pietro Montanini (1626-1689) painter
- Pietro Baglioni (1629-1705) civil architect
- Pierfanti Bartoli (1635-1700) painter and engraver
- Orazio Ferretti (1639-1725) painter and civil architect
- Antonio Battisti Dionigi (1643-1669) military architect
- Bartolommeo Petrini (1643-1664) painter
- Giuseppe Scaglia (1650-1700) sculptor
- Francesco Civalli (1660-1703) painter
- Scipione Angelini (1661-1729) painter
- Giovanni Fonticelli (1662-1716) painter

== Artists Featured in Pascoli's Vite de’ Pittori, Scultori ed Architetti Moderni ==
1. Giambattista Calandra
2. Bernardino Gagliardi
3. Antonino Barbalunga
4. Mario Nuzzi
5. Francesco Cozza
6. Francesco Lauri
7. Pietro del Po
8. Mattia Preti
9. Gianangelo Canini
10. Giovanni Maria Morandi
1. Filippo Lauri
2. Lazzaro Baldi
3. Carlo Cesi
4. Cesare Pronti
5. Giovanni Andrea Carloni
6. Giuseppe Ghezzi
7. Giovanni Bonati
8. Giambattista Benaschi
9. Luigi Garzi
10. Andrea Pozzo
1. Giambattista Buoncuore
2. Antonio Gherardi
3. Lodovico Gimignani
4. Giacinto Calandrucci
5. Daniel Seiter
6. Buonaventura Lamberti
7. Carlo di Voglar
8. Cristiano Reder
9. Cristiano Bernetz
10. Francesco Varnertam
1. Bastiano Ricci
2. Giovanni Odassi
3. Andrea Procaccini
4. Francesco Mochi
5. Giuliano Finelli
6. Andrea Bolgi
7. Lazzaro Morelli
8. Paolo Naldini
9. Jacopantonio Fancelli
10. Giuseppe Mazzuoli
1. Pietro Monnot
2. Carlo Maderno
3. Onorio Lunghi
4. Giambattista Soria
5. Giambattista Gisleni
6. Giambattista Contini
7. Carlo Fontana
