= Ercolano (disambiguation) =

Ercolano is a town in Italy, near Naples.

Ercolano may also refer to:

- Barbara Ercolano (born 1977), Italian astrophysicist
- Ercolano Ercolanetti (1615–1687), Italian painter
- SS Ercolano, a steamship sunk in 1854
- Vincenzo Ercolano (1517–1586), Catholic bishop
- Aldo Ercolano (born 1960), member of the Sicilian mafia

== See also ==
- For saints named Ercolano, see Herculanus (disambiguation)
