= Berrettoni =

Berrettoni is an Italian surname. Notable people with the surname include:

- Emanuele Berrettoni (born 1981), Italian footballer
- Niccolò Berrettoni (1637–1682), Italian Baroque painter

== See also ==
- Berrettini
