= List of pupils and assistants of Carlo Maratta =

The Roman studio of the prolific Italian Baroque painter Carlo Maratta included numerous younger pupils and assistants. Among his many pupils were:

Painter	Dates	Birthplace	Source
Paolo Albertoni			
Martino Altomonte	1657–1745		(W)
Jean Andre	1662–1753	Paris	(H)
Cosmas Damian Asam	1686–1739		(W)
Gérard Audran	1640–1703		(W)
Giovanni Raffaele Badaracco	1648–1726	Genoa	(W)(H)
Antonio Balestra	1666–1740	Verona	(W) (H)
Niccolò Bambini	1651–1736		(H)
Cristiano Bernetz	1628–1722	Hamburg	(R)
Niccolò Berrettoni	1637–1682	Montefeltro	(H)
Jean Christian le Blond	1667–1741	Frankfort	(H)
Francesco Boccacino	1680–1750	Cremona	(H)
Giovanni Domenico Bruggieri	1678–1754	Lucca	(H)
Jan van Bunnik	1654–1727	Utrecht	(H)(AH)
Giacinto Calandrucci	1646–1707		(W)(H)
Giuseppe Bartolomeo Chiari	1654–1727		(W)(H)
Marc van Duvende	1674–1729		(H)
Girolamo Ferroni	1687–1730		(H)
Antonio Filocamo	1669–1748	Messina	(H)
Paolo Filocamo	1688–1743	Messina	(H)
Francesco Fernandi (Imperiali)	1679–1740		(H)
Agostino Gasull	18th-century	Valencia	
William van Inghen	1651–1709	Utrecht	(H)(AH)
Francesco Juvani			(H)
Godfrey Kneller	1646–1723	Lübeck, moved to England	(H)(AH)
Andrea Lanzani	1651–1709		(H)
Giuseppe Laudati	1672–after 1718	Perugia	(H)
Stefano Maria Legnani	1661–1713	Milan	(H)
Theodore van Loon	1630–1678	Brussels	(H)(AH)
Agostino Masucci	1691–1758	Rome	(W)(H)
Giovanni Paolo Melchiore	1664–1721	Rome	(H)
Sebastian Munoz	c.1654–1690		(H)
Girolamo Odam	1681–after 1718	Lorena	(H)
Robert van Oudenarde	1663–1743	Ghent	(H)
Paolo Gerolamo Piola	1666–1724		(W)
Pierre Parrocel	1670–1739		(W)
Domenico Parodi	1672–1742		(W) (H)
Giuseppe Passeri	1654–1714	Rome	(W)(H)
Pietro da Pietri	1663–1708	Rome	(H)
Stefano Pozzi	1699–1768	Rome	(H)
Andrea Procaccini	1671–1734	Rome	(H)
Tommaso Redi	1665–1726	Florence	(W) (H)
Giovanni Stefano Robatto	1649–1733	Savona	(H)
Daniel Seiter	1647–1705	Vienna, moved to Turin	(H)(AH)
Filippo Tancredi	1655–1725	Messina	(H)
Lodovico Trasi	1634–1695	Ascoli	(H)
Francesco Trevisani	1656–1746	Capodistria	(W)
Francesco Varnetam	1658–1724	Hamburg	(R)
Nicolas Vleys	1694–1703	Brussels	(H)
