= Petrini =

Petrini is an Italian surname. Notable people with the surname include:

- Bartolommeo Petrini (1642–1664), Italian painter of the late-Baroque period
- Carlo Petrini (1949–2026), Italian activist and founder of the international Slow Food movement
- Carlo Petrini (footballer) (1948–2012), Italian football player and coach
- Carlo Petrini (scientist) (born 1965), Italian scientist and senior researcher at the Italian National Institute of Health
- Elena Maria Petrini (born 1992), Italian triathlete and 2010 aquathlon world champion
- Francesco Petrini (1744–1819), harpist and composer
- Giuseppe Petrini, Italian composer
- Giuseppe Antonio Petrini (1677– c. 1755), Swiss painter of the late-Baroque, active mainly in Lugano
- Gulli Petrini (1867–1941), Swedish Physicist, writer, suffragette, women's rights activist and politician
- Henrik Petrini (1863–1957), Swedish mathematician
- Hilda Petrini (1838–1895), Swedish clock maker of Italian descent
- Raffaella Petrini (born 1969), Italian religious sister
