= Sant'Agostino, Potenza Picena =

Church in Potenza, Italy

Coordinates: 43°21′56.6″N 13°37′14.3″E

Sant'Agostino is a Roman Catholic church and former monastery located on Via Silvio Pellico, in the historic center of the town of Potenza Picena, province of Macerata, in the region of Marche, Italy. The complex for some years included an elementary school.

== History ==
The Augustinian order is documented in this town by 1250, and they were assigned a church at this location, dedicated to the Magdalen. By the 14th century, the order had been endowed with money to rebuild the church. The convent appears to have been refurbished circa 1420. It acquired a terracotta depicting the Magdalen, attributed to Ambrogio Della Robbia, once conserved in city hall, but stolen in 1997. The half-size bust formerly was placed on the main altarpiece, and is depicted in the large 18th-century canvas by Pietro Tedeschi placed on the main altar after the 18th-century reconstruction.

By the first decades of the 18th century, The church had two naves, eight altars and three portals. Much of the interior decoration dates to the 18th century. Among the paintings in the church is a San Nicola da Tolentino intercedes for the Souls of Purgatory, attributed to followers of Cristoforo Roncalli: for example, Pietro Paolo Giacometti or Giovanni Antonio Scaramuccia. The canvas depicting St Thomas of Villanova distributing Charity has the same attribution.
