= Palazzo della Corgna, Castiglione del Lago =

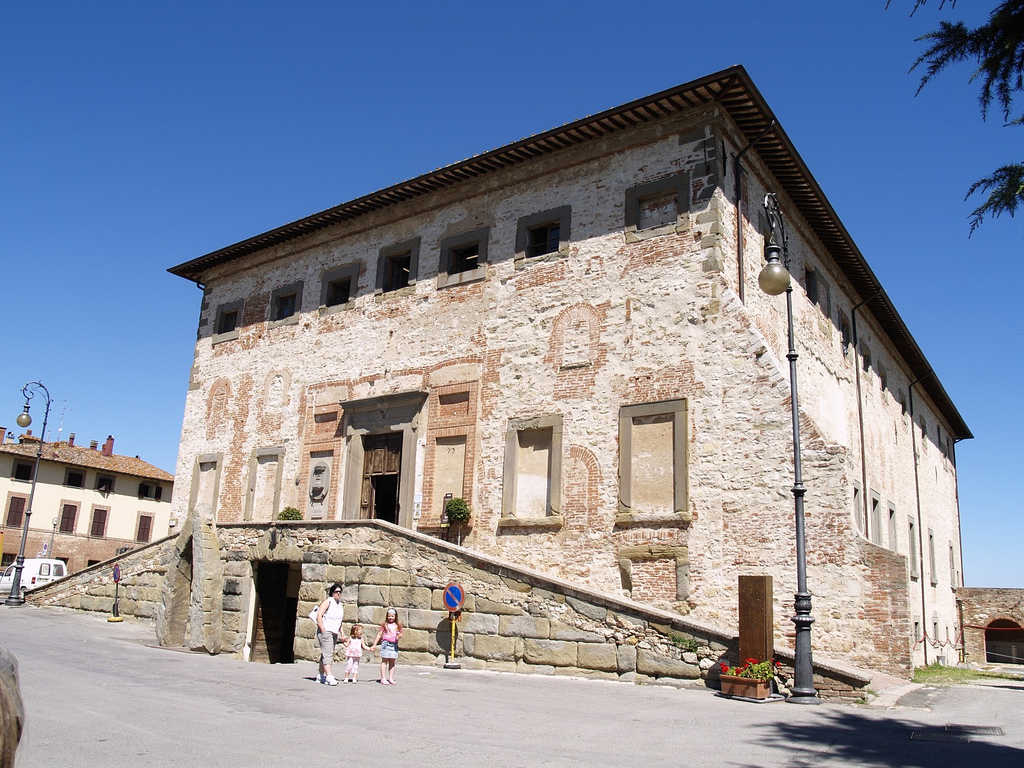

The Palazzo della Corgna is a Renaissance palace located in Castiglione del Lago at the shores of Lago Trasimeno, in the Province of Perugia, in Umbria.

It was commissioned during 1550 to 1563 by the condottiere Ascanio della Corgna (1516–1571), Marchese di Castiglione del Lago, but the palace exterior remains unfinished. Ascanio was the brother of Cardinal Fulvio Giulio della Corgna, and both were nephews of Julius III, pope from 1550 to 1555. Among the original architects were Vignola and Galeazzo Alessi. The palace was repeatedly sacked, and parts suffered from fires in 1824 and 1870. It was built in 1870 by the Comune di Castiglione del Lago.

The central stanza in the piano nobile has large enveloping frescoes by Niccolò Circignani, depicting episodes from Roman and Latin myths, and a depiction of the Battle of Trasimeno. The palace is linked to the adjacent castle by a secret passageway.

Other artists involved in this decorations were Leonardo da Borgo, Egidio di Niccola Egidi, Fabio della Corgna, and Salvo Savini. The frescoes recall work by Giorgio Vasari and Taddeo Zuccari in Rome.

By 1643, the feudal properties were removed from the della Corgna family for the actions of Fulvio della Corgna, and place under papal control. In 1651, the palace was bought by the aristocratic Amedei family, and in 1793 by Signori Mazzuoli.
