= Franz Werner von Tamm =

German painter (1658–1724)

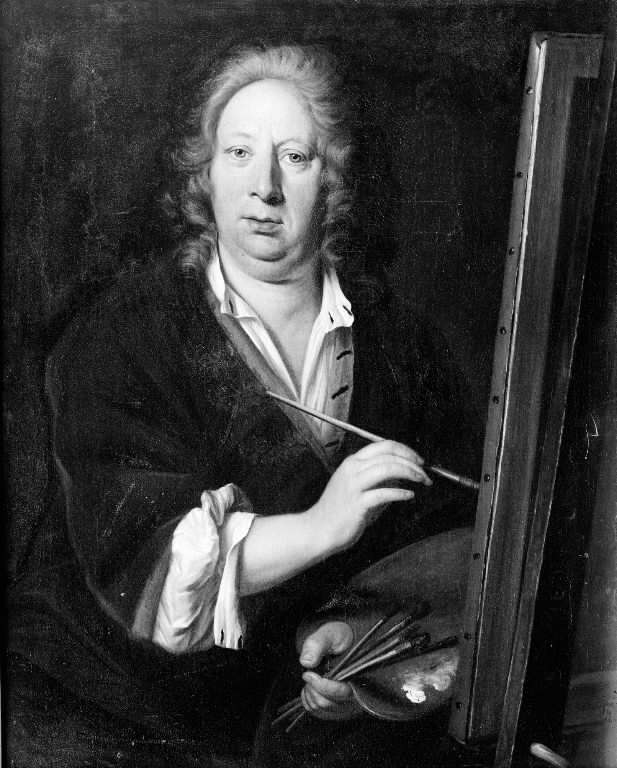
- Portrait by Jan Kupecký
- Born: 6 March 1658; Hamburg, Holy Roman Empire
- Died: 10 July 1724 (aged 66); Vienna, Archduchy of Austria
- Education: Carlo Maratta
- Known for: Genre painting
- Movement: Baroque

Franz Werner von Tamm (6 March 1658 – 10 July 1724) was a German Baroque painter who travelled to and worked in Italy.

== Biography ==
Von Tamm was born in Hamburg. He was first trained in his hometown by German Baroque painters Dietrich von Sosten and Johann Joachim Pfeiffer. According to Houbraken, who called him Joano Vernero Tam in a poem about the members of the Bentvueghels, he joined the Bent with the name "Dapper" and was a good flower painter.

In 1685, Tamm moved to Rome, where he became a member of the circle of Flemish artists led by Caspar van Wittel. In Rome he was trained in the studio of Carlo Maratta. He was particularly influenced by the Flemish genre painter David de Coninck and became the teacher of Pietro Navarra.

Tamm painted in the style of Frans Snyders and Jan Fyt, enriched with Italian stylistic elements, depicting still-lifes (Hamburger Kunsthalle), antique vases, reliefs and statues, and fruit and floral arrangements set in open landscapes. His somewhat dark, heavy colours and thick application of paint are reminiscent of pictures by Giovan Battista Ruoppolo.

From the mid-1690s he lived and worked in Vienna as painter to the imperial court, leaving only occasionally to work in Liechtenstein and Passau (1702). During this period he painted in a style close to that of Jan van Huysum. He died in Vienna on 10 July 1724.

== Gallery ==
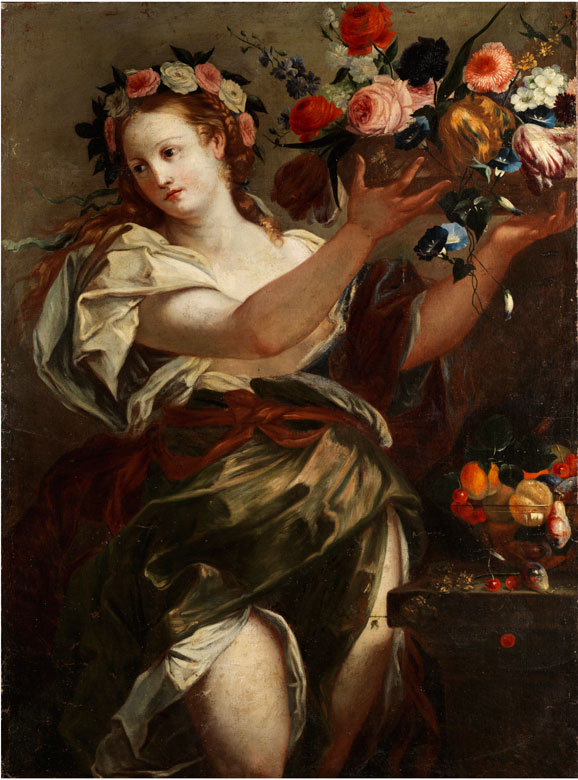
Flora Presenting a Basket with Flowers, c. 1680

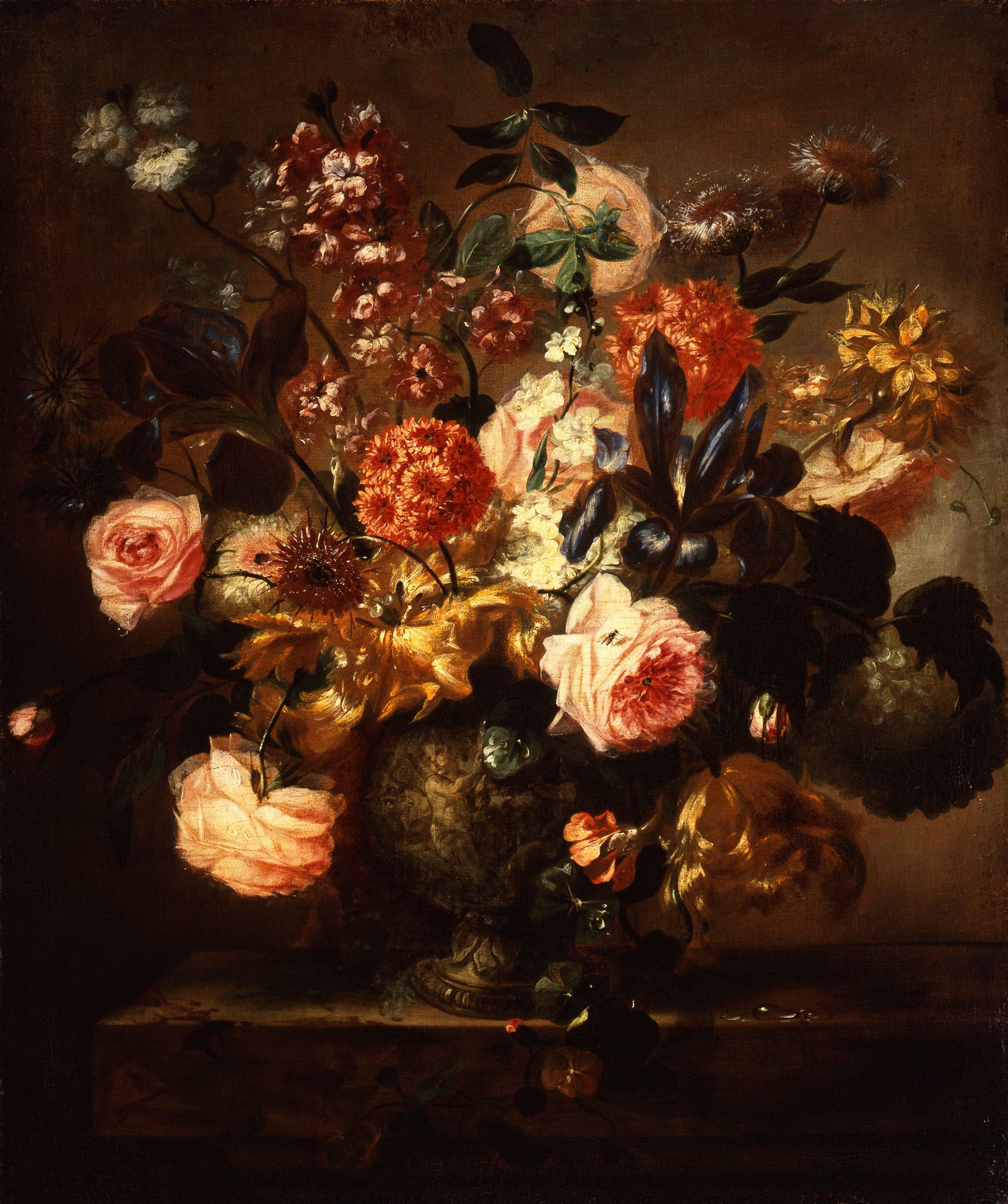
Vase with Flowers, c. 1695

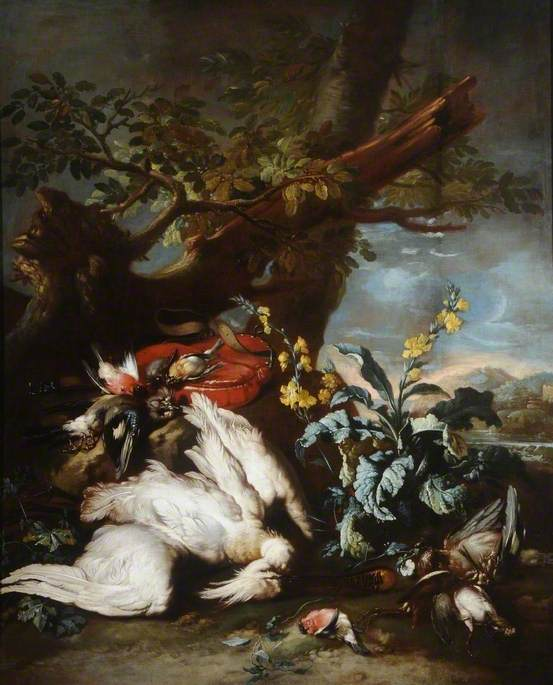
Dead Birds, c. 1705

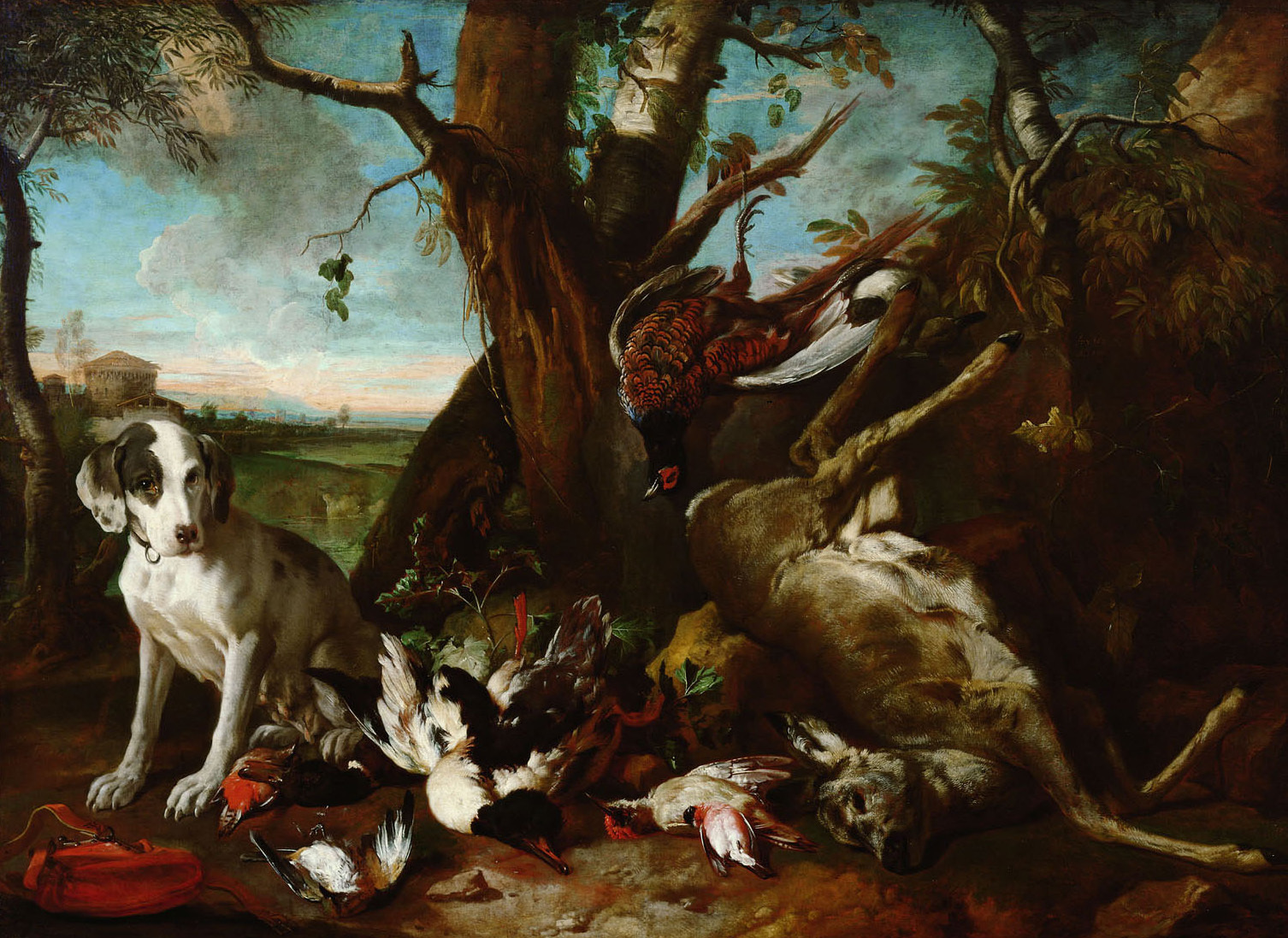
Still Life With Hunting Trophies And A Young Dog, 1706

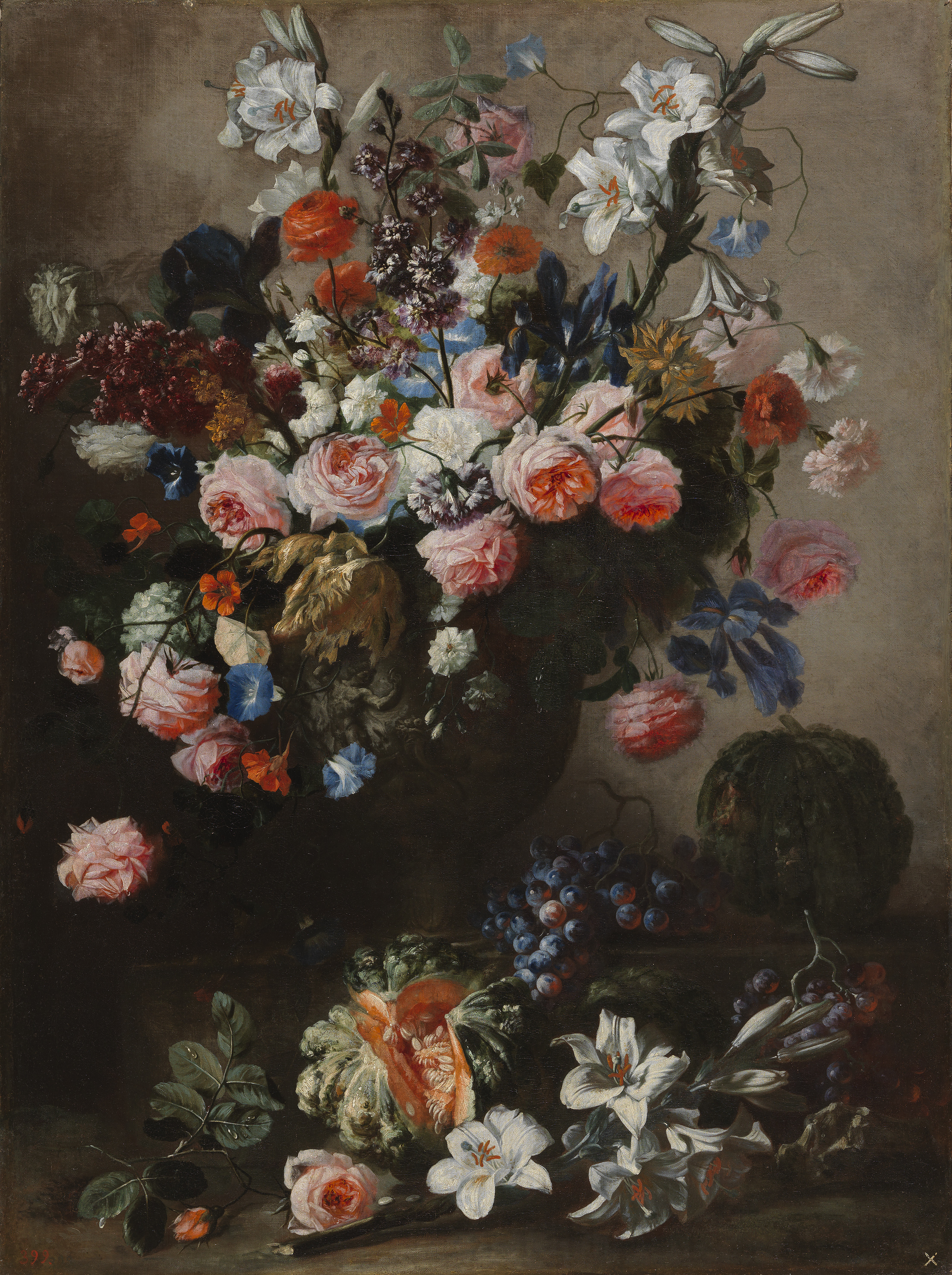
Flowers, c. 1700

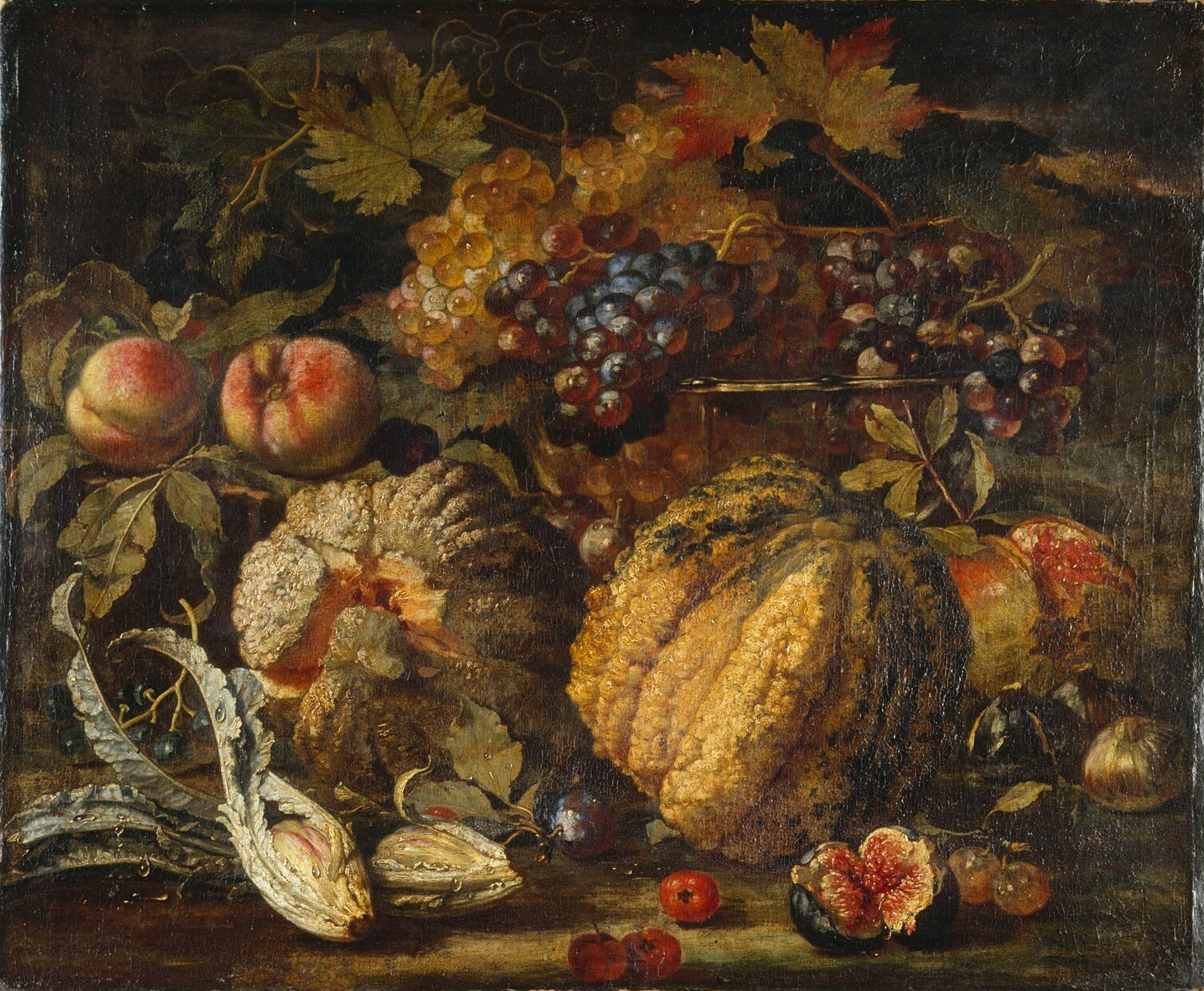
Still life with Fruits, c. 1705

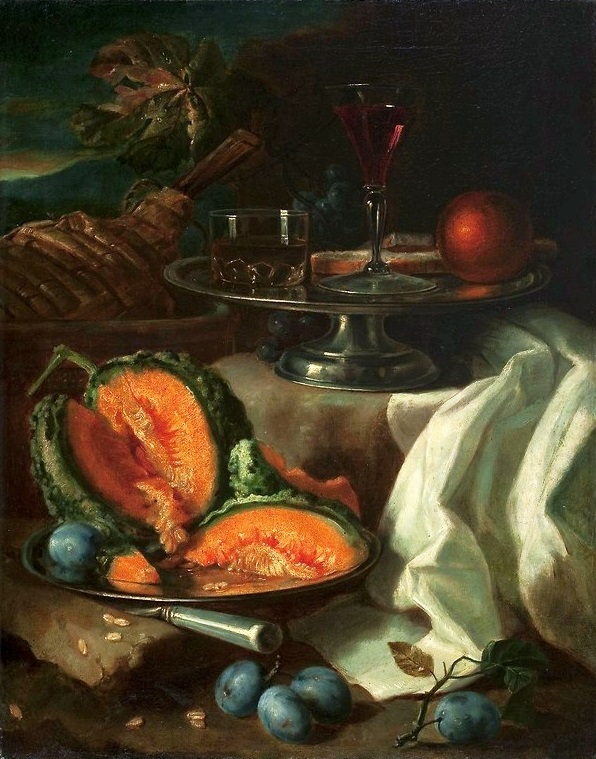
Still life with a musk melon

== Bibliography ==
- Franz Werner von Tamm on Artnet
- Pascoli, Lione (1730–36). Vite de’ pittori, scultori ed architetti moderni. Vol. 2. Rome. pp. 368–78.
- Balthasar Denner. Franz Werner Tamm (exh. cat., Hamburg, B. A. T. Haus, 1969), pp. 29–36.
