= Castello Bufalini =

Castle near San Giustino, Italy

Coordinates: 43.5500°N 12.1833°E

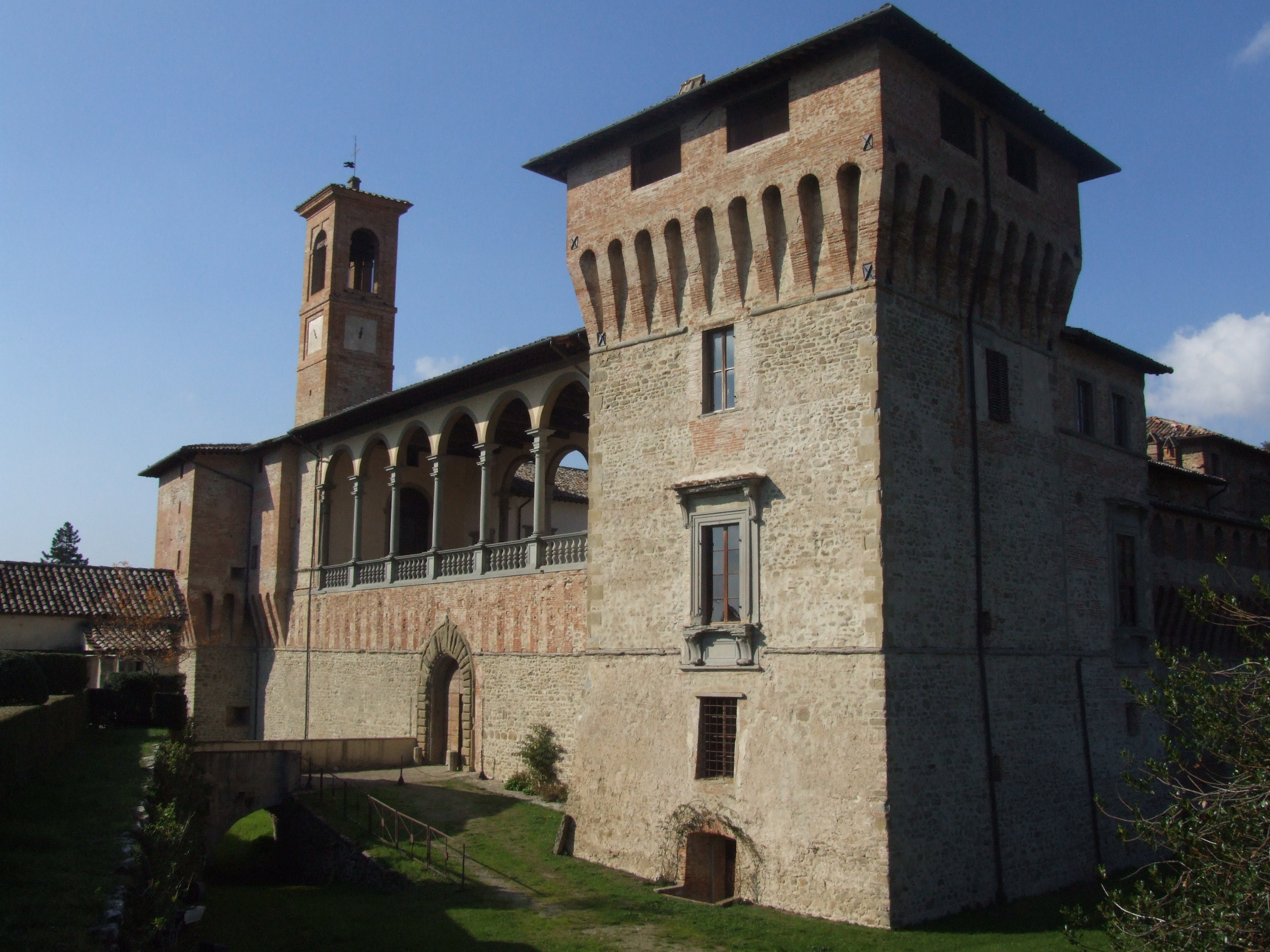
Castello Bufalini

The Castello Bufalini is a castle-residence outside of the town of San Giustino, Province of Perugia, in the Region of Umbria, Italy.

== History ==
Built in medieval period by the Ghibelline Dotti family of Sansepolcro, it was rebuilt in the Renaissance period (circa 1500) by the Marquis Niccolò di Manno Bufalini of Città di Castello, who had become lord of San Giustino.

The work was directed by Mariano Savelli and the brothers Giovanni and Camillo Vitelli. After 1530, Giulio Bufalini expanded the fortress using as an architect Nanni Unghero. The square layout of the fortress from the outside is replete with medieval military architecture measures for defence including crenellation and corner bastion towers.

Decoration of the interiors was begun in earnest with Giulio Bufalini who commissioned frescoed interiors from Cristofano Gherardi of San Sepolcro (1508-1556), who painted frescoes of antique Roman grotteschi interspersed with quadri riportati depicting mythological and historical scenes. The topics include the history of Rome, the Myth of Prometheus and Pandora. Starting in the final years of the 17th century, under the guidance of the architect and painter Giovanni Ventura Borghesi, the castle was repurposed into a rural villa, with gardens and a labyrinth designed in 1692. The interiors were also frescoed by Mattia Battini.

In 1789, an earthquake toppled a bell-tower and caused major damage to the structure. Short of funds, the marquis owner sold much of his art collection, including works collected by Cardinal Giovanni Ottavio Bufalini, and works in the art gallery of Palazzo Bufalini of Città di Castello.

After renovations in the twenty-first century, the castle and gardens are now open to visitors.
