= Niccolò Berrettoni =

Italian painter

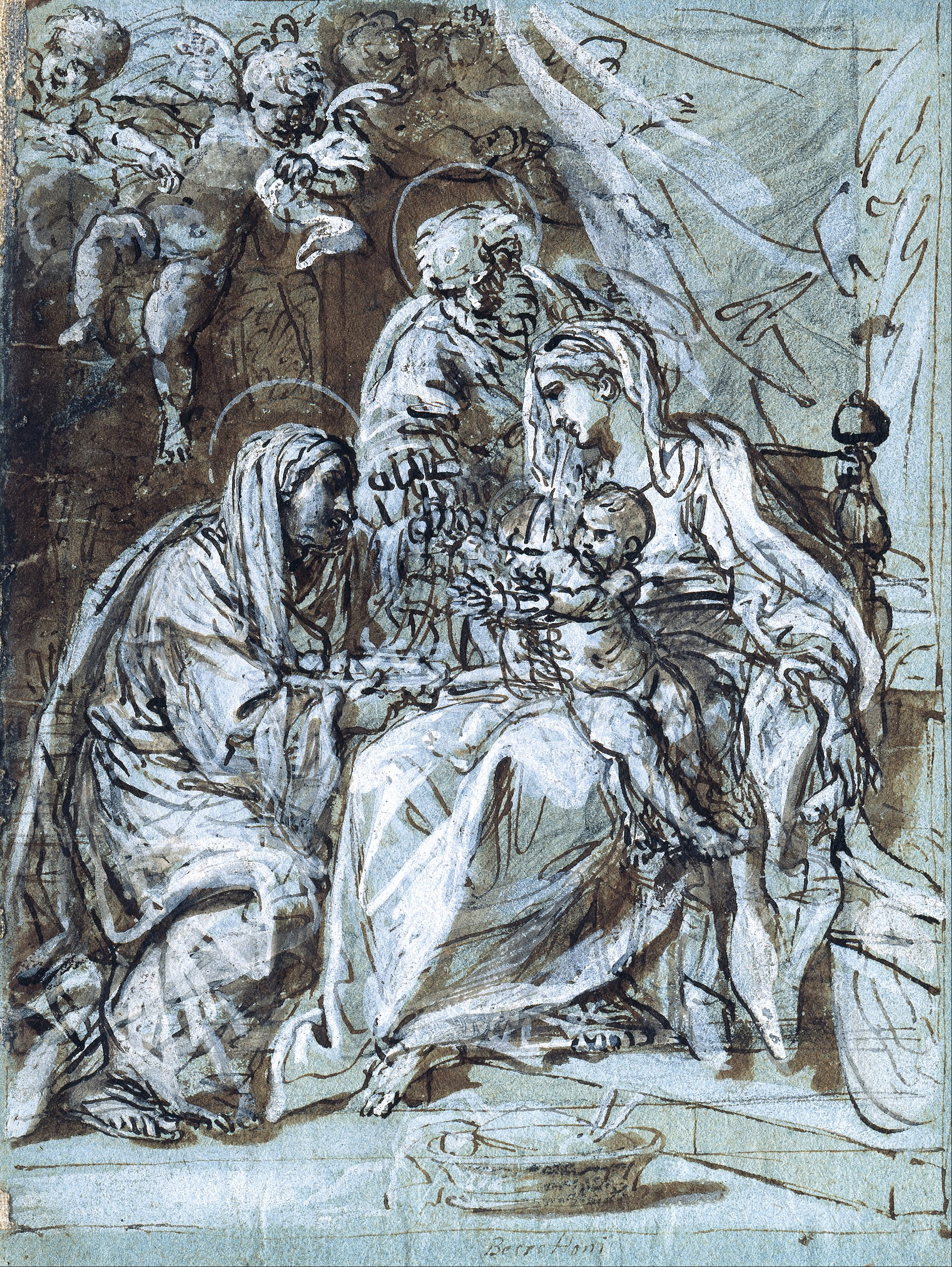
- The Holy Family and Saint Ann, Reading a Psalm by Niccolò Berrettoni, Museum Kunstpalast, 1679
- Born: 15 December 1637; Macerata Feltria, Papal States
- Died: February 1682 (aged 44); Rome, Papal States
- Education: Carlo Maratta
- Known for: Painting
- Movement: Baroque

Niccolò Berrettoni (15 December 1637 – February 1682) was an Italian painter of the Baroque period.

== Life and work ==
Niccolò Berrettoni was born in Macerata Feltria on December 14, 1637. As a child he studied under Simone Cantarini in Pesaro; at the death of this master, he moved circa 1670 to Rome to work for the large studio of Carlo Maratta. In 1675, while still in the orbit of Maratta, he entered as an academic into the Roman painter's guild, the Accademia di San Luca. Under the patronage of Maratta, he obtained important commissions; however, in the last years of his life, his relationship with this master altered. According to Pascoli, in 1680 when Berrettoni was about to receive the commission of the ceiling fresco of the nave of San Silvestro in Capite, Maratta, fearing the rising fame of his pupil, caused the commission to be assigned instead to the older Giacinto Brandi. Embittered by the affair, Pascoli said Berrettoni fell ill, and died in February 1682. Some of Berrettoni's painting executed for aristocratic clients, including the Flight to Egypt (mentioned in an estimate of 1724 and cited by Pascoli) are missing.

== Selected works ==
Works ascribed to Berrettoni include:

- Frescoes of Palazzo Altieri (1675), his most praised work, that were first confused with the painting of the ceiling in the first antechamber, which actually belongs to Domenico Maria Canuti, and only in 1961 were they identified by Clark with those of the current Red Hall. The decoration includes the oval of the ceiling with an allegory of passionate love (Venus holding the torch, Cupids and the Three Graces) and the two lateral lunettes with the Colloquium of Love and Psyche (or Venus and Cupid) and Allegory of the Spring.
- Chapel of Santa Anna (3rd on right) in the church of Santa Maria in Montesanto (1679 - 1682), work in which he was involved included the ceiling oval depicting God in Glory in the clouds surrounded by angels, plumes with cherubs, the two lateral lunettes with the Meeting of Anna and Gioacchino and the Apparition of the Angel to Gioacchino; the beautiful picture above the altar, today very darkened, which represents the Madonna with the Child and Saint Anna. In the Villa Falconieri of Frascati: two lunettes, one with portraits of the members of the Falconieri family, are stylistically similar to the figures of the vault of Santa Maria in Montesanto and to the lunettes found in the Palazzo Altieri.
- Frescoes of the vault of the third chapel in Santa Maria del Suffragio, which he started, were entrusted by Maratta to Giuseppe Bartolomeo Chiari upon his death.
- In Palazzo Oliva (formerly the Cattani house) and in the Casino of the villa Cattani in Paolucci in Trebbiantico there still exist frescoes by Berrettoni.
- Marriage of Mary on the high altar of San Lorenzo in Piscibus in Rome, engraved by Pier Santi Bartoli.
- Adoration of the Shepherds and the Baptism of Christ in the Gallery of Drescla.
- Madonna with Child and Young St John the Baptist in the Museum of Ascoli Piceno.
- Holy Family for Santa Maria in Montesanto, engraved by Frezza.

== Bibliography ==
- Bryan, Michael (1886). Robert Edmund Graves (ed.). Dictionary of Painters and Engravers, Biographical and Critical. Vol. I: A-K. London: George Bell and Sons. p. 118.
- Damigella, Anna Maria (1967). "BERRETTONI, Niccolò". Dizionario Biografico degli Italiani (in Italian). Vol. 9: Berengario–Biagini. Rome: Istituto dell'Enciclopedia Italiana. ISBN 978-88-12-00032-6.
