= Mariano d'Eusterio =

Italian painter

Mariano di Eusterio or d'Eusterio, also known as Mariano di Perugia (1470s – 1527 or 1547) was an Italian painter of the Renaissance period, active in Perugia.

Details of his life are few. He is recorded in the biographies of Leone Pascoli. He was said to be a pupil of Pietro Vannucci. He painted in 1512 an altarpiece for the Collegio del Cambio in Perugia. He is said to be alive in 1526. He also painted for the churches of Sant'Agostino in Ancona and San Domenico in Perugia.
