= Paolo Gismondi =

Italian painter (1612–1685)

- St. Benedict in Glory, 1660, Madonna del Bagno, Casalina, Deruta
- Born: 1612; Perugia, Papal States
- Died: 1685 (aged 72–73); Rome, Papal States
- Other name: Paolo Perugino
- Education: Giovanni Antonio Scaramuccia; Pietro da Cortona
- Known for: Painting
- Movement: Baroque

Paolo Gismondi (known also as Paolo Perugino; 1612 – 1685) was an Italian painter of the Baroque period.

== Biography ==
Born in Perugia, he studied with Giovanni Antonio Scaramuccia but then moved to Rome, where he became a pupil of Pietro da Cortona whose style he proficiently followed throughout his career. In 1641 he became a member of the Accademia di San Luca. According to Filippo Titi and Lione Pascoli, he frescoed the tribune (St. Agatha Received into Glory and four Allegorical Figures) and the central aisle (scenes from the Life of St. Agatha) in Sant'Agata de' Goti, Rome, perhaps during the 1660s (all in situ).

Surviving documents for Sant'Agnese in Agone (Rome) show that he executed frescoes in the sacristy there in 1664, including: St. Agnes in Glory, Purity and Religion on the vault and a now partially damaged representation of the Virgin in Glory with Angels above the altar (in situ). In 1668 he was nominated for membership of the Congregazione dei Virtuosi al Pantheon and also executed frescoes in San Giovanni a Porta Latina (Rome), including the Condemnation of St. John the Evangelist (in situ; restored 1912) in the tribune vault.

Giovanni Francesco Morelli suggested that he had also painted altarpieces for churches in Perugia, but this aspect of his career remains unsubstantiated and the paintings either do not survive or are presently of uncertain attribution, including two in the church in Madonna del Bagno, near Deruta (Umbria). According to Pascoli, later in life Gismondi traveled to Naples, but died in Rome in 1685.

== Bibliography ==
- Morelli, Giovanni Francesco (1683). Brevi notizie delle pitture, e sculture che adornano l’augusta città di Perugia. Perugia: Costantini. p. 186.
- Titi, Filippo (1686). Ammaestramento utile, e curioso di pittura, scultura ed architettura nella chiesa di Roma. Rome: Giuseppe Vannacci. pp. 59, 110, 248.
- Pascoli, Lione (1732). Vite de’ pittori, scultori ed architetti perugini. Rome: Antonio de' Rossi. pp. 202–4.
- Waterhouse, Ellis K. (1937). Baroque Painting in Rome. London: Macmillan. pp. 72–3.
