= The Solemnisation of the Marriage of James III and Maria Clementina Sobieska =

Painting by Agostino Masucci

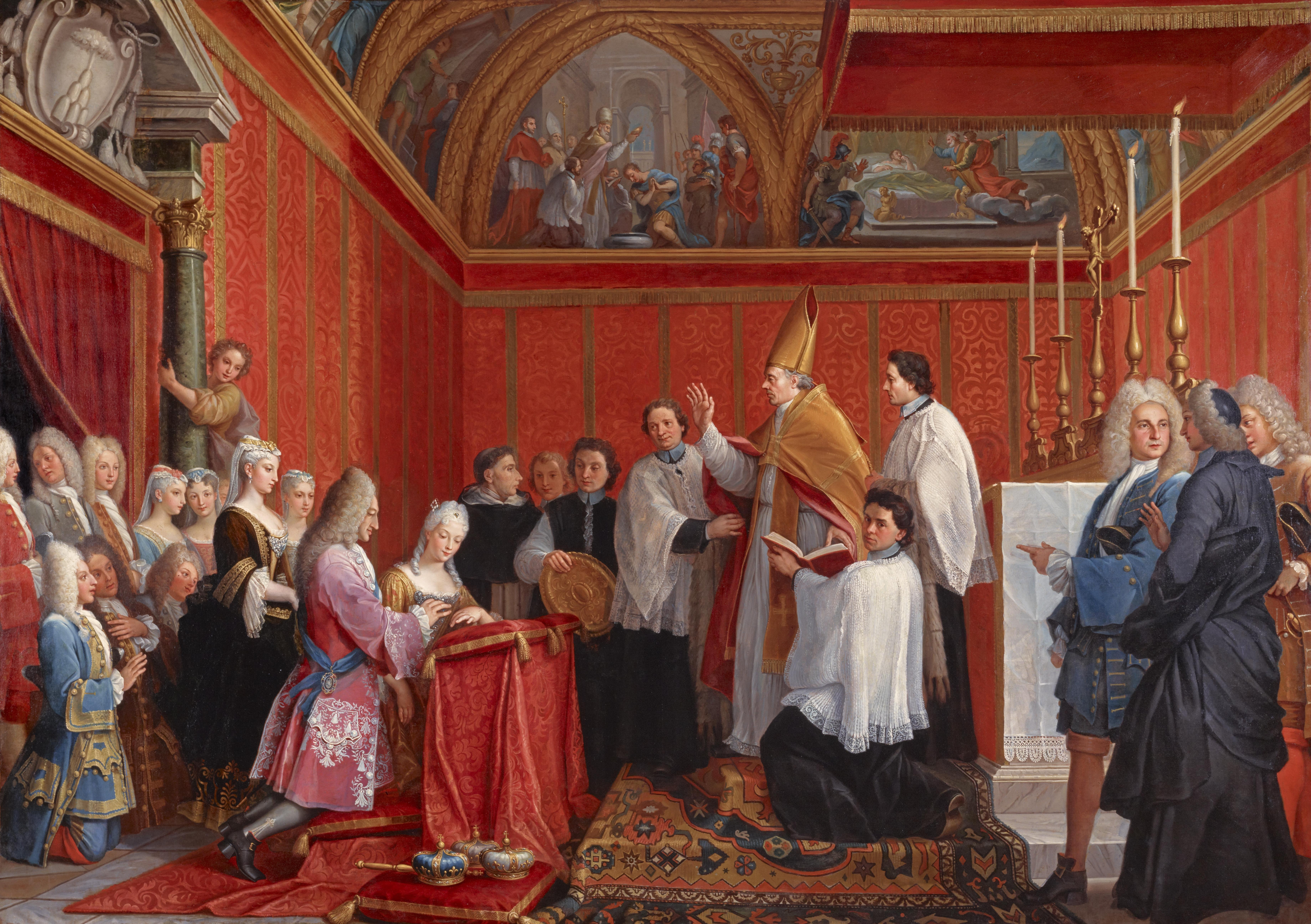
- Artist: Agostino Masucci
- Year: 1735
- Type: Oil on canvas, history painting
- Dimensions: 243.5 cm × 342 cm (95.9 in × 135 in)
- Location: Scottish National Portrait Gallery, Edinburgh

The Solemnisation of the Marriage of James III and Maria Clementina Sobieska is an oil on canvas history painting by the Italian artist Agostino Masucci, from 1735.

== History and description ==
It depicts the wedding of James Francis Edward Stuart, styled James III by his English supporters, and Maria Clementina Sobieska in September 1719 in Montefiascone. The ceremony is being conducted by the bishop Sebastiano Pompilio Bonaventura. James was the Jacobite pretender to the British throne. Born in London in 1688 he was Prince of Wales until the Glorious Revolution ousted his father James II. After years of exile in France he subsequently took up residence in the Palazzo Muti in Rome. The couple had two sons, the elder of whom, Charles Edward Stuart, led the Jacobite forces during the Rising of 1745. Today the painting is in the collection of the Scottish National Portrait Gallery ,in Edinburgh, which acquired it in 1977.

== Bibliography ==
- Ashdown-Hill, John. Royal Marriage Secrets: Consorts and Concubines, Bigamists and Bastards. History Press, 2013.
- Corp, Edward. The King Over the Water: Portraits of the Stuarts in Exile After 1689. Scottish National Portrait Gallery, 2001.
- Williams, Andrew Gibbon & Brown, Andrew. The Bigger Picture: A History of Scottish Art. BBC Books, 1993.
