= Pinacoteca Comunale, Deruta =

Coordinates: 42.982115°N 12.420093°E

The Pinacoteca Comunale di Deruta, located in the town's municipal office building, the medieval Palazzo dei Consoli is the town or comune art gallery and museum. It is located on Piazza dei Consoli 15 in the town center of Deruta, in the Province of Perugia, region of Umbria, Italy. The small town also houses the Museo Regionale della Ceramica.

Among the collections are a detached fresco depicting God the Father, and Saints Romano and Rocco by Perugino. There are two works by Niccolò di Liberatore (l’Alunno), depicting a Madonna dei Consoli and a Gonfalone of Sant’Antonio Abate. The museum houses a 13th-century Franciscan missal on parchment.

The second floor in the museum has a collection donated in 1931 of works gathered by the art author and collector Lione Pascoli, including still lifes, genre paintings, battle paintings, landscapes, and bambocciate. Among the painters featured include Giovanni Battista Gaulli (il Baciccio), Antonio Amorosi, Francesco Trevisani, Sebastiano Conca, Francesco Graziani, and Pieter Van Bloemen.
