= Teodora Danti =

Italian painter (c.1498–c.1573)

Teodora Danti (c.1498–c.1573) was a painter and writer from Perugia, Italy. Described as spirited and virtuous, she was never married nor had children. She was the aunt of famed Florentine Mannerist sculptor Vincenzo Danti, yet goes unmentioned in an epitaph of the Danti family written by her nephew Ignazio Danti. With the exception of her brief biography by Perugian writer Lione Pascoli in 1732, Danti continues to be ignored as an artist and painter, possibly because there are currently no known paintings by or portraits of her, nor have any of her writings been identified.

Only mention about her (except in her father’s "De sphaera mundi" translation in Italian) is an entry in Lione Pascoli’s Vite de Pittori, Scultori, ed Architetti Perugini (Lives of Perugian Painters, Sculptors and Architects) (1732).

== Early life ==
Educated from a young age by her father Piervincenzio, Teodora Danti was schooled in reading, writing, grammar, rhetoric, mathematics, and drawing. Her mother, however, did not approve of her education, and often tried to intervene in her studies, favouring household chores over intellectual pursuits for her only daughter. Eventually her father won out amongst her family, and she was allowed to continue her studies without interference.

== Career ==
She later learned to paint in the style of Pietro Perugino by copying paintings by the master and his followers. After acquiring enough skill from the study of Perugino's paintings, she began to design her own compositions with invention and experienced colouring. Although no identified paintings by Danti exist, her biographer Lione Pascoli describes her works as full of grace, accuracy, and taste. Similarly, no documentation of commissions or purchases of her paintings are known, but Pascoli mentions that Danti continually sent paintings out of town. It is unknown whether she was sending paintings away to fulfill commissions or if she was hoping to obtain commissions in the future, as Sofonisba Anguissola had done. Teodora Danti refused to take a husband, and remained in the house of her father, and subsequently her brother after her father had died, continuing to paint and study. She was also talented with a pen, writing both witty poetry and scholarly treatises. She worked on a commentary of Euclid's geometry as well as a treatise on painting, but it is unknown if she finished either text. None of her writings exist today.

== Death ==
Teodora Danti continued to work on her arts until about a year before her death around 1573. Her biographer Pascoli describes a commemoration of her written by Ottavio Lancellotti, a fellow Perugian citizen, in his manuscripts still found in the Biblioteca Comunale Augusta, Perugia, today. Lione Pascoli himself immortalized Teodora Danti by writing a biography of her in his Vite de’ pittori, scultori, ed architetti perugini, e dedicate alla maesta di Carlo Emanuel re di sardegna 1732. Testifying to her high standing and talents in Perugia, Danti was the only female artist to be given an independent life story in Pascoli's book.

== Sources ==
- Pascoli, Lione. Vite de’ pittori, scultori, ed architetti perugini, e dedicate alla maesta di Carlo Emanuel re di sardegna 1732. Amsterdam: B. M. Israel, 1965. 75-79.
- Dabbs, Julia K. Life Stories of Women Artists, 1550-1800: An Anthology. Surrey, England and Burlington, VT: Ashgate Publishing, 2009. 205-212.
- Ellet, Mrs. E. F. (Elizabeth Fries). Women Artists in All Ages and Countries. New York: Harper & Brothers Publishers, 1859. 43.

Also mentioned in: (source not consulted)

- Greer, Germaine. The Obstacle Race: The Fortunes of Women Painters and their Work. New York: Farrar, Straus, Giroux, 1979. 338.
