= Giulio Cesare Angeli =

Italian painter

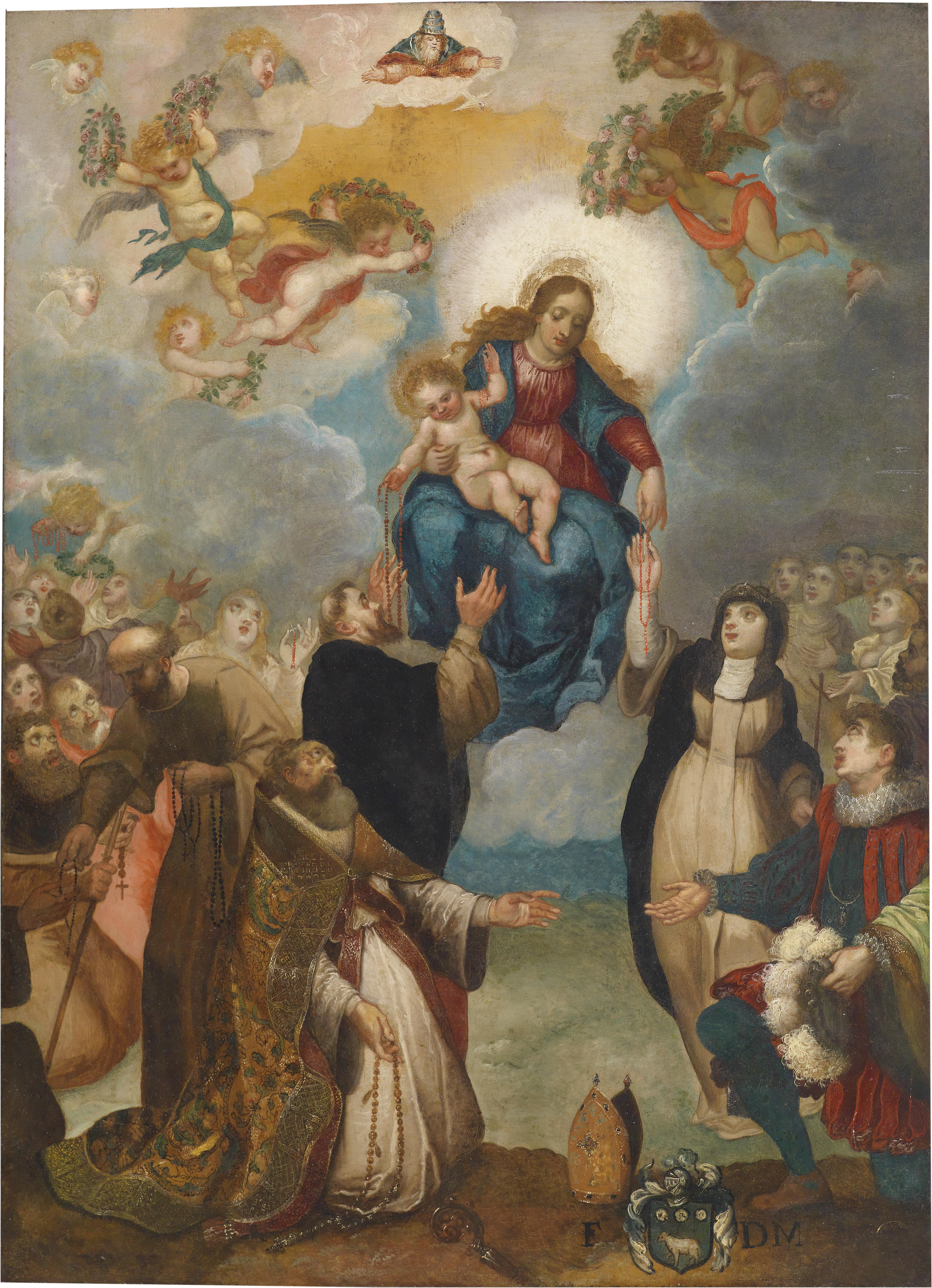
Handing Over the Rosary

Giulio Cesare Angeli (c. 1570 – 26 July 1630) was an Italian painter of the early Baroque, active mainly in Perugia and Bologna.

== Biography ==
Born in Perugia, he trained with Annibale Carracci and/or Ludovico Carracci. Among his works are at the Oratorio di Sant Agostino in Perugia. He is also listed by Lupattelli as painting a Guardian Angel leading boy with St Michael Archangel slaying Lucifer for the Ospedale Maggiore; a Virgin and child with Saints Ivone, Margaret, Martha, Francis, and Dominic for the church of Santa Lucia di Colle Landone; a Virgin and child with Saints Ivone, Martha, Dominic, and Francis for San Lorenzo; and a San Carlo Borromeo for the church of the Carmelitani Scalzi. There was a work also in Sassoferrato.

He helped train Stefano Amadei, Cesare Franchi, and Cesare Pollini (Il Francia).
