= Agostino Masucci =

Italian painter (1690–1758)

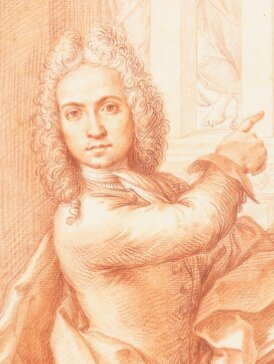
- Self-portrait by Masucci
- Born: 29 August 1690; Rome, Papal States
- Died: October 19, 1758 (aged 68); Rome, Papal States
- Known for: Painting
- Movement: Baroque, Rococo

Agostino Masucci (Italian pronunciation: [aɡoˈstiːno maˈzuttʃi]; 29 August 1690 – 19 October 1758) was an Italian painter of the late-Baroque or Rococo period.

== Biography ==
Born in Rome, he initially apprenticed with Andrea Procaccino, and then became a member of the studio of Carlo Maratta. He joined the Accademia di San Luca in 1724, and from 1736 to 1738, he was director or Principe. Masucci worked for the House of Savoy, and also obtained commissions from John V of Portugal due to his friendship with Filippo Juvarra and Luigi Vanvitelli. For example, for the latter he painted the main altarpiece of the Cathedral of Évora.

Masucci also made the models for the three main mosaic panels in the Chapel of St. John the Baptist, designed by Luigi Vanvitelli (along with Nicola Salvi) for King John V of Portugal. It was built in Rome starting in 1742, disassembled in 1747, and shipped to Lisbon, where it was reassembled in the Church of St. Roch (Igreja de São Roque). It was completed in 1750, although the mosaics in it were not finished until 1752. Built of many precious marbles and other costly stones, as well as gilt bronze, it was held to be the most expensive chapel in Europe up to that time.

For the Royal house of Savoy, he painted a series of historical canvases along with Giambattista Pittoni, Sebastiano Conca, and Francesco Monti. Most of the works he completed, however, were in churches in Rome, including ovals in Santa Maria in Via Lata, and works in San Francesco di Paola, San Marcello al Corso, Santa Maria del Popolo, Santissimo Nome di Maria in Via Latina and Santa Maria Maggiore. He painted the Madonna with the Seven Founders of the Servite Order (c. 1728 found in the Art Institute of Chicago.

His academicism and grand-manner painting span styles from Baroque to incipient Neoclassicism. He was a tutor to Stefano Pozzi, Johan Zoffany, and Gavin Hamilton. He may have mentored Pompeo Batoni.

== Gallery ==
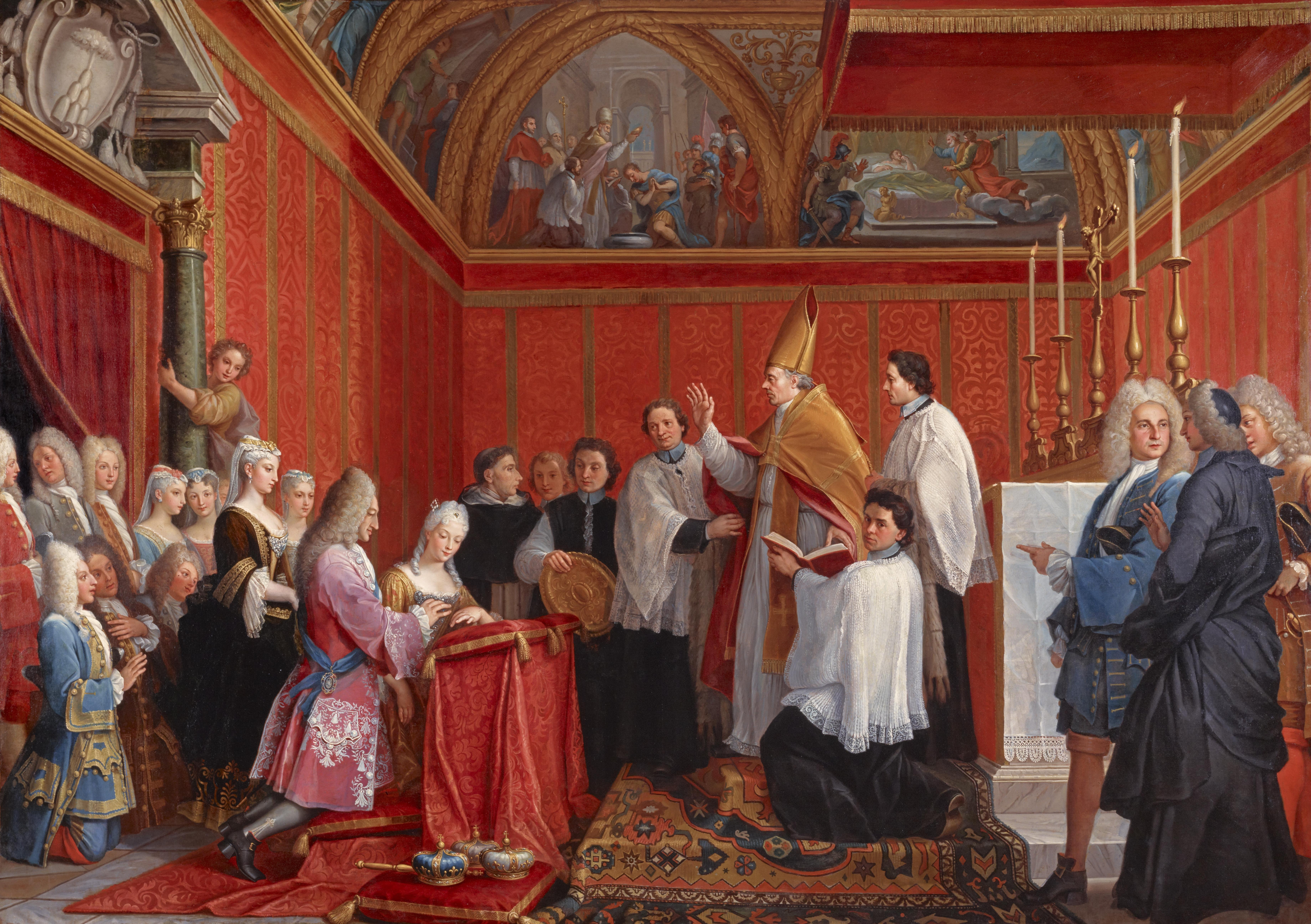
The Solemnisation of the Marriage of James III and Maria Clementina Sobieska, Scottish National Portrait Gallery, Edinburgh

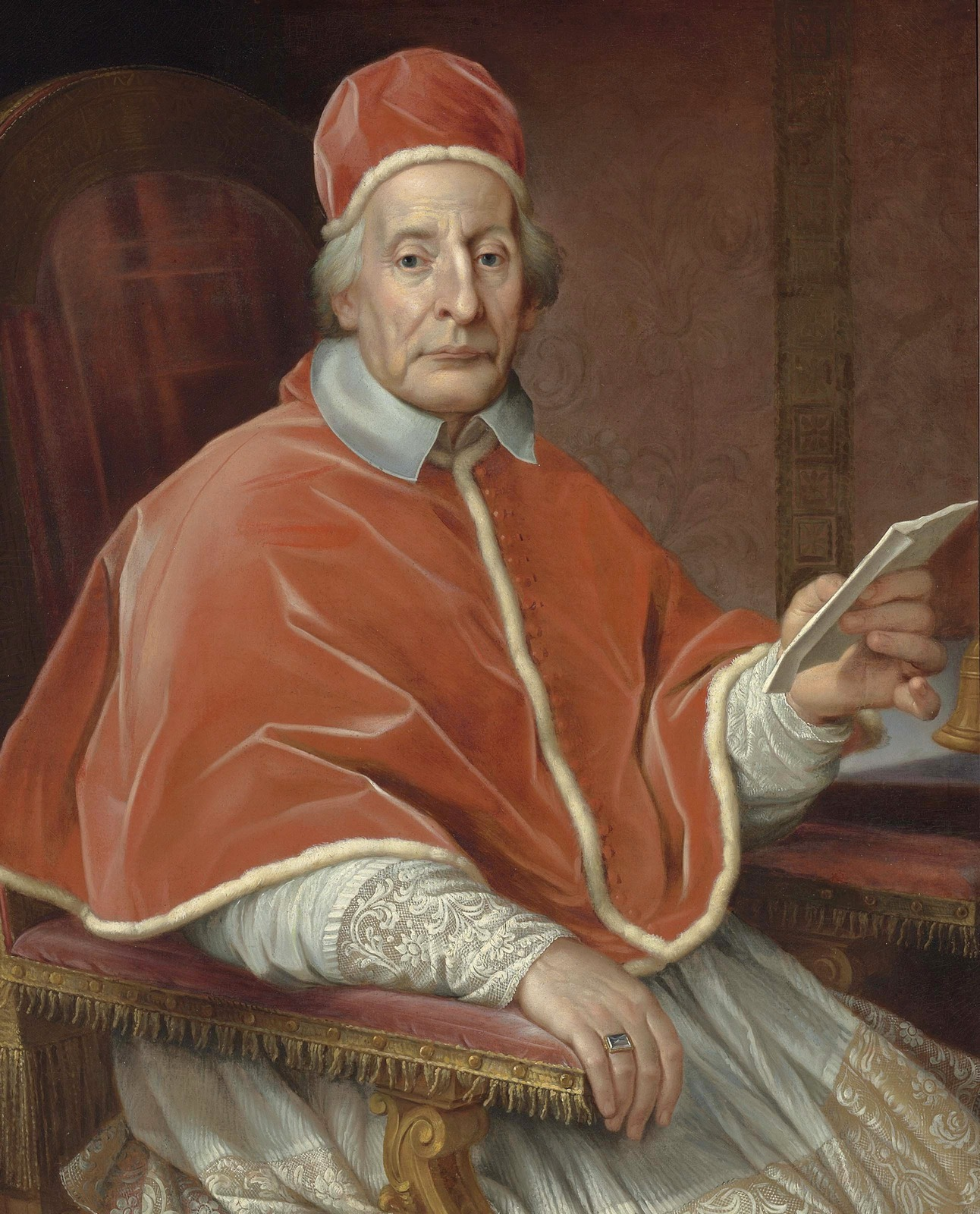
Portrait of Pope Clement XII, priv. col.

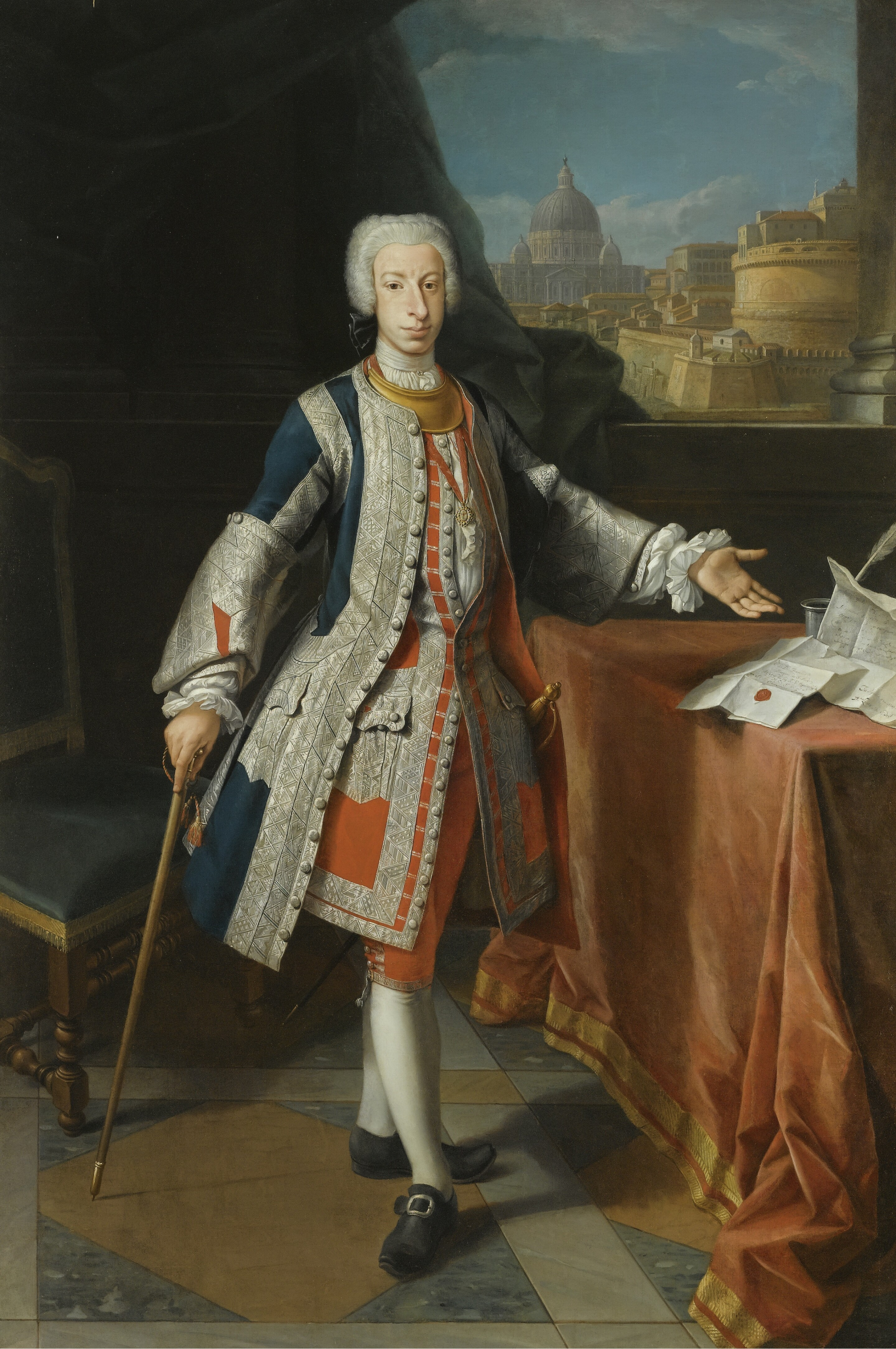
Portrait of Francisco Pescatori Baroni Mastigoli y Pasqual, priv. col.

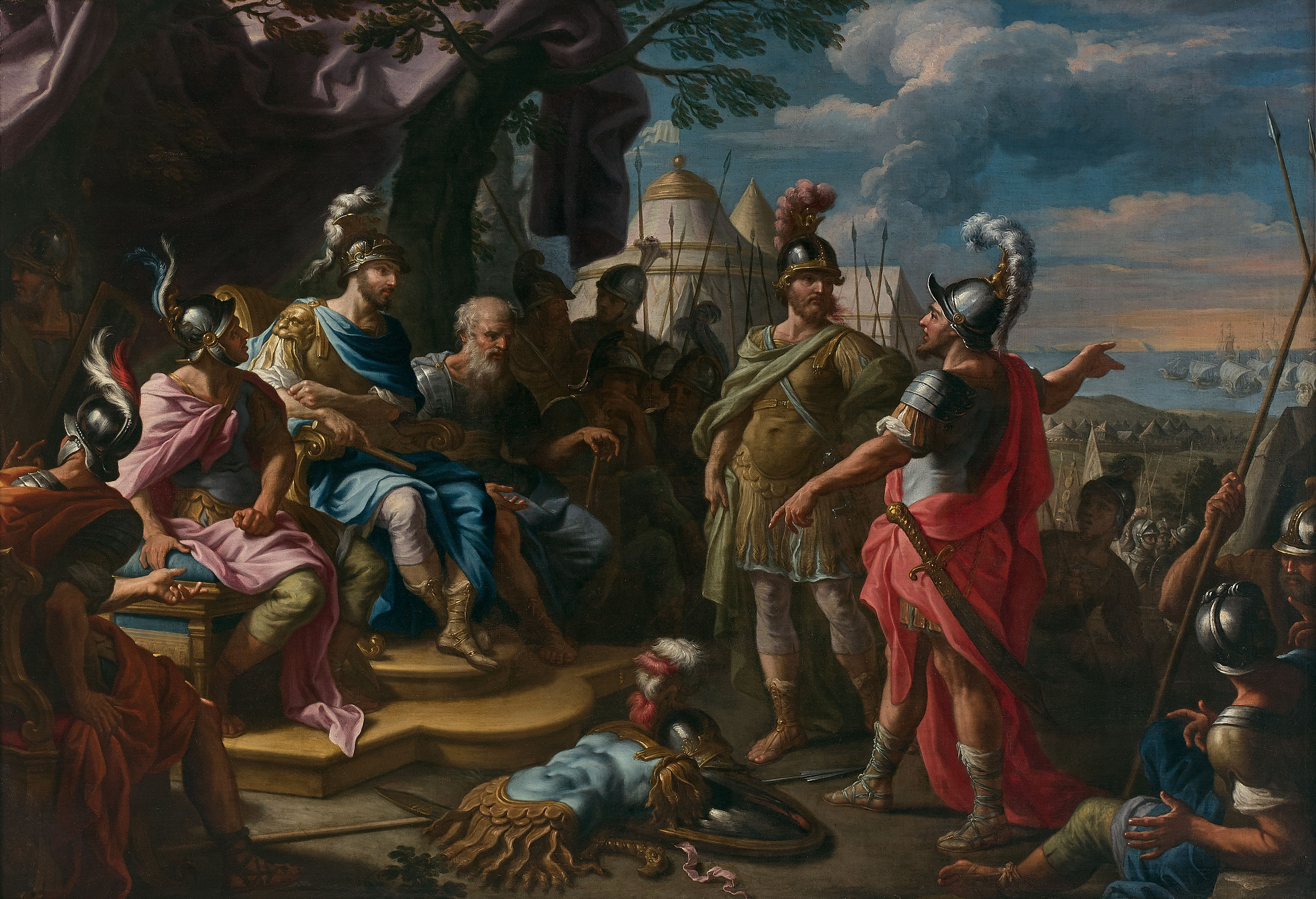
The Argument between Ajax and Odysseus over Achilles' armour, priv. col.

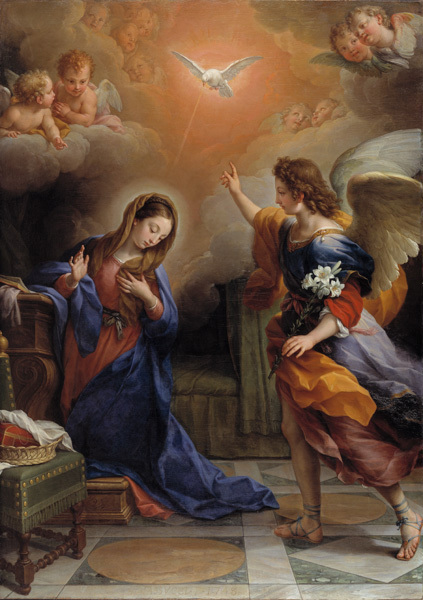
The Annunciation, Copenhagen, National Gallery of Denmark

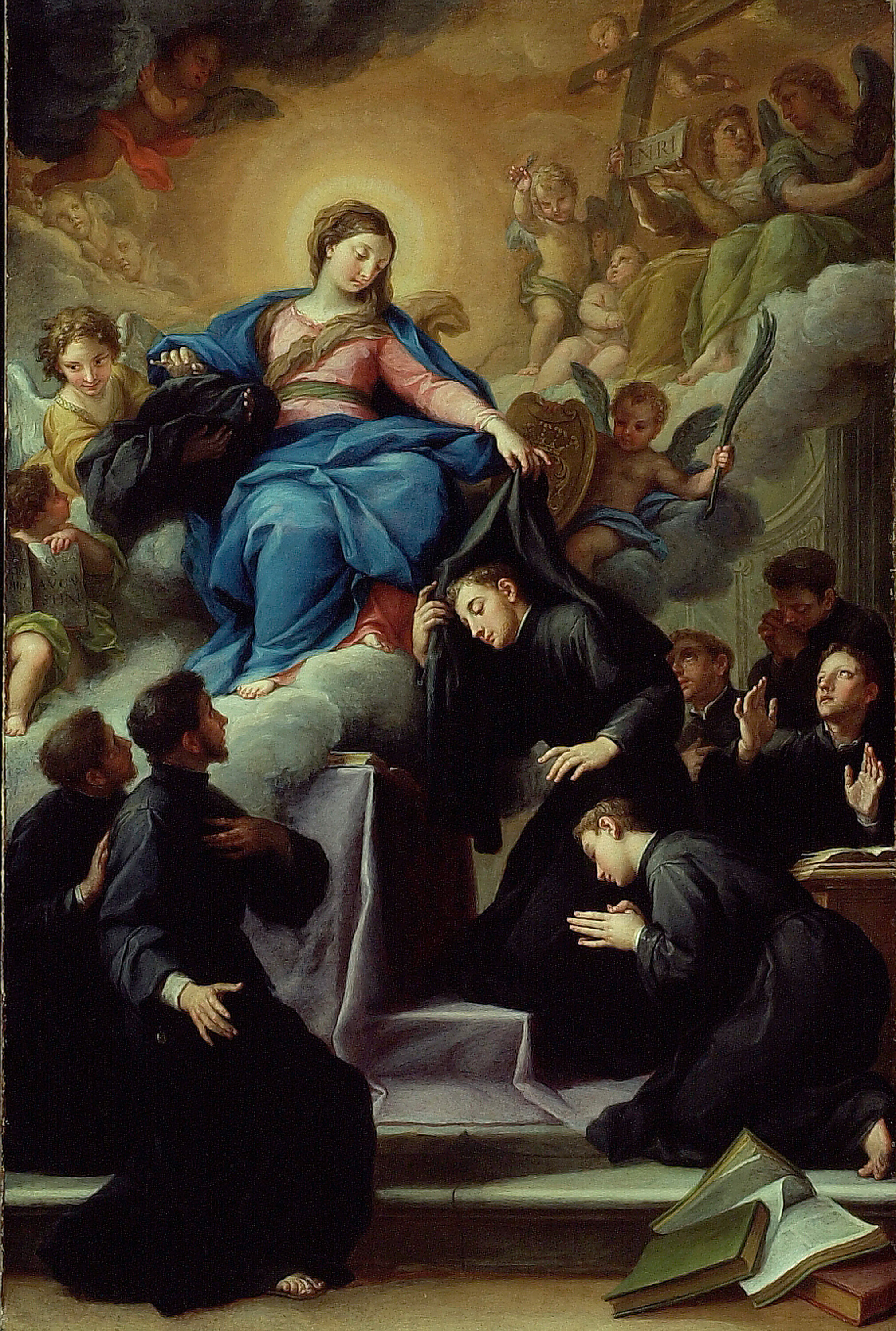
The Madonna with the Seven Founders of the Servite Order, Chicago, Art Institute of Chicago

== See also ==
- Sebastiano Conca
- Pompeo Batoni
- Jacopo Zoboli

== Sources ==
- Da Gai, Valerio (2008). "MASSUCCI, Agostino". Dizionario Biografico degli Italiani (in Italian). Vol. 72: Massimo–Mechetti. Rome: Institute of the Italian Encyclopaedia. ISBN 978-88-12-00032-6.
- Short biography.
- Short biography.
