= Giovanni Francesco Bassotti =

Italian painter (1600–1665)

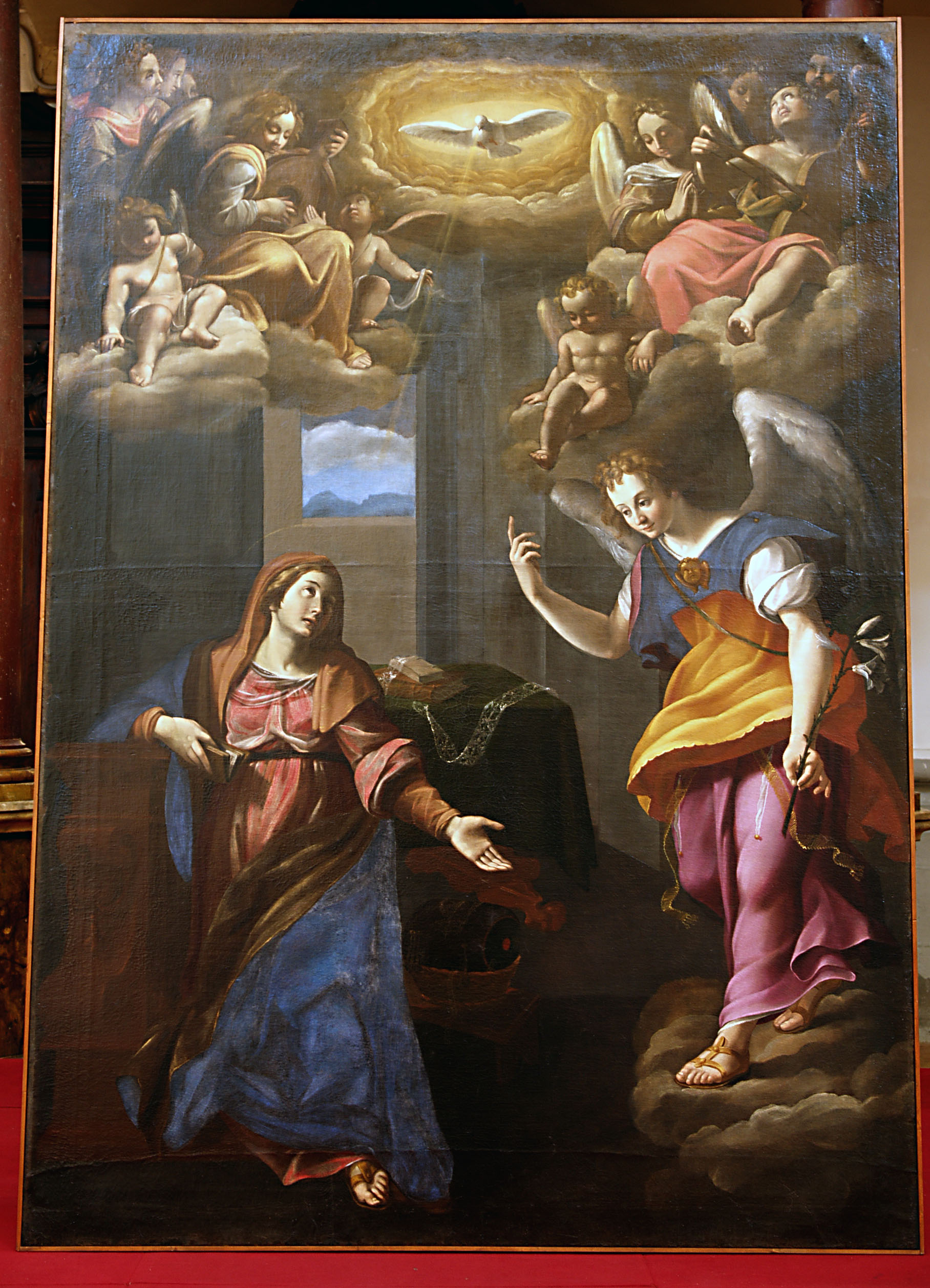
Annunciazione

Giovanni Francesco Bassotti (1600 – 1665) was an Italian painter of the Baroque period.

== Biography ==
He was born in Assisi, Perugia around 1600 to a family of painters originally from Assisi. He got his first lessons of art from his grandfather. He was then sent to Rome, but Lione Pascoli, from whom we learned this information did not mention the name of the artist to whom Bassotti was apprenticed. But was prolific in Perugia.

He painted the Annunciation in the church of S. Angelo della Pace dell'Alessi; another Annunciation in the church of Santa Maria del Popolo (after 1626, disappeared with the deconsecration of the church); a Nativity of the Virgin in the Church of the Suffrage; an Annunciation in the Ranieri chapel in the basilica of San Pietro; a Flagellation of Christ in the church of the nuns of Sant'Agnese; a Birth of the Baptist in the oratory of the confraternity of St. John the Baptist; a painting representing St. Dominic Carried by the Virgin to Soriano, in the church of the Convertite (dated 1647, dispersed).

Other canvases were attributed to Bassotti by Pascoli, Orsini and Siepi, include a banner in S. Sebastiano alla Conca (disappeared), Conception of the Virgin in Santa Maria degli Aratri (disappeared with the demolition of the church), Crucifixion and saints in the monastery of St. Lucia (disappeared, was dated 1614 and this makes it doubtful that the attribution of the Siepi was unfounded), Madonna with Child in the old public schools (disappeared), Pietà in the Jesuit college (disappeared), another Pietà in the congregation of St. Philip Neri, Crucifixion in the Oradine college (disappeared with the closing of the college).

Bassotti also painted fresco: he made six lunettes with stories of Adam and Eve in the oratory of St. Benedict; other lunettes with Stories of the Passion in the church of S. Maria Nuova dei Serviti that were destroyed in 1804 with the opening of windows in the central nave. In Spello, in the church of S. Lorenzo, Bassotti left a faint painting on canvas dated 1635 on the altar of S. Felice.

He died in Perugia around 1665.

Bassotti was a modest painter, who showed that he saw and studied contemporary Bolognese artists, especially Guercino and Guido Reni. His pupils were Annibale Leonzi. and his nephew Pietro Montanini.
