= Carlo Cesio =

Italian painter

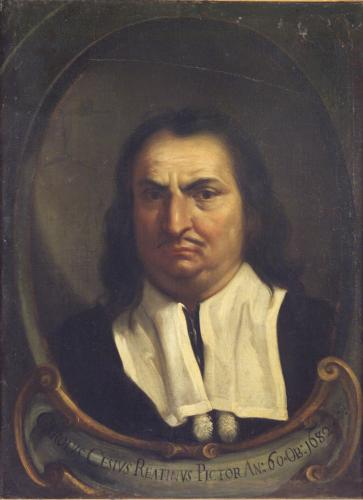
- Portrait of Carlo Cesi in the Art Collection of the Accademia di San Luca
- Born: 17 April 1622; Antrodoco, near Rieti, Papal States
- Died: 6 January 1682 (aged 59); Rieti, Papal States
- Education: Pietro da Cortona
- Known for: Painting; Engraving
- Movement: Baroque
- Patrons: Alderano Cybo

Carlo Cesio or Carlo Cesi (17 April 1622– 6 January 1682) was a Baroque painter and engraver of the Roman school. He is best known for his engravings of Baroque Roman fresco cycles and for his Cognitione de' Muscoli del Corpo Humano per il Disegno, an illustrated manual of human musculature that was widely disseminated among art students across Europe.

== Biography ==
Cesio was born in 1622 at Antrodoco, near Rieti, then part of the Papal States. His father was a certain Pietro, who had fled his native Todi after committing a murder. At the age of sixteen, Carlo was sent to nearby Rieti in order to learn to draw and paint, but soon afterwards he moved to Rome, where he entered the workshop of Pietro da Corton. Lione Pascoli records Cesio as one of the most faithful pupils of Cortona, who helped the younger artist obtain his first commissions. Cesio was under the protection of Cardinal Alderano Cybo, whose assistance contributed to the success of his career.

Cesio matriculated in the Accademia di San Luca in 1651. In 1657, he participated in the decoration of the Galleria di Alessandro VII in the Quirinal Palace, creating the fresco the Judgement of Solomon. The fresco is notable for its fidelity to Cortona's style, and directly quotes motifs from Cortona’s ceiling frescoes in the Gallery of the Palazzo Pamphilj in Piazza Navona.

That same year, he published a series of 44 engravings based the cycle of frescoes executed by Annibale Carracci and his studio around 1597 in the Galleria of the Palazzo Farnese in Rome. Cesio's etchings became renowned for their accuracy, and went through five editions within a few years. From 1659 onwards, Cesi pursued a career as an engraver and realized several plates after the works of contemporary Italian masters. His plates are etched and finished off with the burin, in a free, masterly style.

Around 1659, he created some of his most important works, including the triptych depicting the Trinity, the Immaculate Conception, and St. Dionysius, in the halls of the French Academy in Rome, and the Mystical Marriage of St. Catherine in the Cesi Chapel in Santa Maria della Pace. In 1660, he frescoed the Cesi Chapel in Santa Maria Maggiore in Rome. While at first Cesio's work shows links with the style of Cortona, after the 1670s he seems to have turned to a pictorial language closer to Carlo Maratta, perhaps under the influence of Lazzaro Baldi who was active in Rome in the same years as was Cesio. In 1673, he returned to his native Rieti, where he worked until the following year. In the last years of his career, Cesio received a great deal of recognition, culminating with his election in 1675 as principe of the Accademia di San Luca. Around 1679, he published another series of engravings based on frescoes by Guido Reni in the Palazzo Mazarino on the Quirinal Hill, and by Cortona in the Gallery of the Palazzo Pamphilj. Having retired to Rieti in 1681, he died on 6 January 1682, aged 59.

== Works ==
=== Frescoes ===
- The Judgment of Solomon (1657), Galleria di Alessandro VII, Quirinal Palace, Rome;
- The Trinity, the Immaculate Conception, and St. Dionysius of Corinth (triptych), French Academy, Rome;
- The Mystical Marriage of St. Catherine (1659), Cesi Chapel, Santa Maria della Pace, Rome;
- The Holy Family, Cesi Chapel, Santa Maria Maggiore, Rome.

=== Prints ===
Christ and the Canaanite Woman, enraved by Cesio after Annibale Carracci, Rijksmuseum, Amsterdam

- Christ and the Canaanite Woman, after Annibale Carracci;
- The Martyrdom of St. Andrew, after Guido Reni;
- Frontispiece of Vincenzo Chiavelloni's Discorsi della Musica;
- 16 plates based on Pietro da Cortona's frescoes in the Gallery of the Palazzo Pamphilj;
- 44 plates based Annibale Carracci's frescoes in the Farnese Gallery;
- 9 plates based on Giovanni Lanfranco's frescoes in the Buongiovanni Chapel in the Basilica di Sant'Agostino;
- 8 plates based on Giovanni Lanfranco's frescoes on the dome of Sant'Andrea della Valle;
- 10 plates based on Guido Reni's frescoes in the Palazzo Mazarino, Rome (now the Palazzo Pallavicini-Rospigliosi);
- Cognitione de' Muscoli del Corpo Humano per il Disegno, a collection of anatomic engravings, published in Rome in 1679. It contains illustrations with explanations of two skeletons and fourteen myological plates, including five full-length écorchés. The book was reissued several times in German translation under the title L'anatomia dei pittori del signore Carlo Cesio (Nuremberg, 1705, 1706, 1759). Another German translation of Cesio's work was published in Augsburg in 1708 under the title Eine herrliche Anweisung und wolgegründete Fürstellung von der Anatomie des gantzen Menschlichen Cörpers.
Engraving by Cesio of Annibale Carracci's frescoes in the Farnese Gallery, Bibliothèque nationale de France, Paris

The Martyrdom of St. Andrew, engraving by Cesio after Guido Reni, Rijksmuseum, Amsterdam

The Coronation of the Virgin, engraving by Cesio after Giovanni Lanfranco's frescoes in the Bongiovanni Chapel in Sant'Agostino, Rome, Rijksmuseum, Amsterdam

Diana and Endymion engraving by Cesio after Annibale Carracci, Vanderbilt University Museum of Art

== Bibliography ==
- Pascoli, Lione (1736). Vite de' pittori, scultori, ed architetti moderni. Vol. II. Rome: Calzone. pp. 67, 163–176.
- Choulant, Johann Ludwig (1852). "Carlo Cesio". History and Bibliography of Anatomic Illustration in Its Relation to Anatomic Science and the Graphic Arts. Translated by Edward Clark Streeter. Chicago: University of Chicago Press. pp. 256–257.
- (in German) Matthias Kunze: Cesi, Carlo. In: Allgemeines Künstlerlexikon. Die Bildenden Künstler aller Zeiten und Völker (AKL). Band 18, Saur, München u. a. 1997, ISBN 3-598-22758-2, S. 13
- Vannugli, Antonio (2003). "Cesi [Cesio], Carlo". Grove Art Online. Oxford: Oxford University Press. doi:10.1093/gao/9781884446054.article.T015623.
- Tamanti, Giulia (1980). "CESI, Carlo". Dizionario Biografico degli Italiani (in Italian). Vol. 24: Cerreto–Chini. Rome: Institute of the Italian Encyclopaedia. ISBN 978-88-12-00032-6.
