= Mattia Battini =

Italian painter

Mattia Battini (1666 – 1727) was an Italian painter of the Baroque period, active in Umbria.

== Biography ==
He was born in Citta di Castello and studied in Perugia under the painter Pietro Montanini. He moved to Perugia where he became a citizen. In Citta di Castello, he painted the small cupola of the church of the Gesu. He painted in oil the lunettes of the church of the Benedictines. For the Confraternity of the Holy Trinity, he painted a large canvas depicting the Birth of the Virgin. He painted the ceiling of the church of Santa Caterina and painted frescoes for the church of Belvedere. He helped fresco the Castello Bufalini in Perugia.
