= Berrettini =

Berrettini is an Italian surname. Notable people with the surname include:

- Jacopo Berrettini (born 1998), Italian tennis player
- Matteo Berrettini (born 1996), Italian tennis player
- Pietro Berrettini (1596/7 – 1669), better known as Pietro da Cortona, Italian Baroque painter and architect
