= Stefano Amadei =

Italian painter

Stefano Amedei (20 January 1580 – 20 January 1644) was an Italian painter of the early Baroque period, who painted still-life and sacred paintings.

== Biography ==
Born in Perugia; he trained there with Giulio Cesare Angeli, and developed a studio in Rome. Lupattelli claims he studied perspective under the mathematician Lemme Rossi. Amedei later opened a studio/school in Perugia. He painted for the chapel of the Madonna Addolorata in the church of Santa Maria Nuova; an altarpiece of the Sorrowful Virgin before the Cross, and two lateral paintings depicting the Presentation of Mary at the Temple and the Marriage of Mary, and smaller paintings of Jesus with the crown of thorns and St Paul. He painted the main altarpiece (1632) for the church of San Severo, depicting the Virgin in Glory with the Jesus child, and Saints Benedict, Romuald, Severo, Andrea, Agata, and Lucia. For the Public library, he painted a Shield of the City with the Virgin and Child and St Catherine. He is attributed a canvas copy of Raphael's God the Father and Seraphim.

Among his pupils was Fabio della Cornia.
