= Giuseppe Laudati =

Italian painter

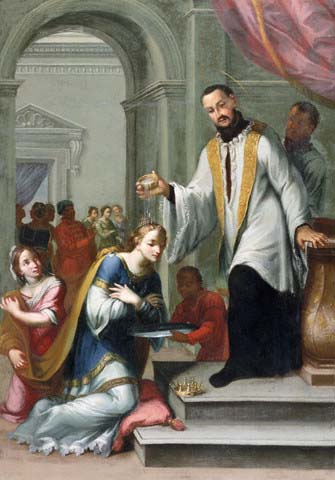
Saint Francis of Xavier in the Process of Baptising the Queen of Mexico, oil on canvas

Giuseppe Laudati (c. 1672 – after 1718) was an Italian painter of the Baroque period.

He was born in Perugia and studied under Pietro Montanini in that town, and under Carlo Maratti in Rome. Frezza etched after his works.
