= Giovanni Fonticelli =

Italian painter (1662–1716)

Giovanni Fonticelli (April 4, 1662 – May 5, 1716) was an Italian painter of the late-Baroque period.

He was born in Perugia, and was a pupil of his uncle, Pietro Montanini. He painted a canvas for the sacristy of Santo Spirito of Perugia. He painted for a church in Corciano.
