= Ercolano Ercolanetti =

Italian painter

Ercolano Ercolanetti (27 April 1615 – 1687) was an Italian painter of landscapes, active in his native Perugia.

He studied for a time in Rome with an unknown master; he returned to Perugia where he worked under Bernardino Gagliardi and Fabio della Cornia.
