= Herculanus =

Herculanus can refer to:

- St. Herculanus of Brescia
- St. Herculanus of Perugia (Sant' Ercolano)
- St. Herculanus of Piegaro
- Sts. Taurinus and Herculanus, martyrs of Ostia, see Basilica of Saint Paul Outside the Walls
- Flavius Bassus Herculanus, a senator betrothed to Justa Grata Honoria

== See also ==
- Ercolano
- Herculaneum
