= Pietro Montanini =

Italian painter

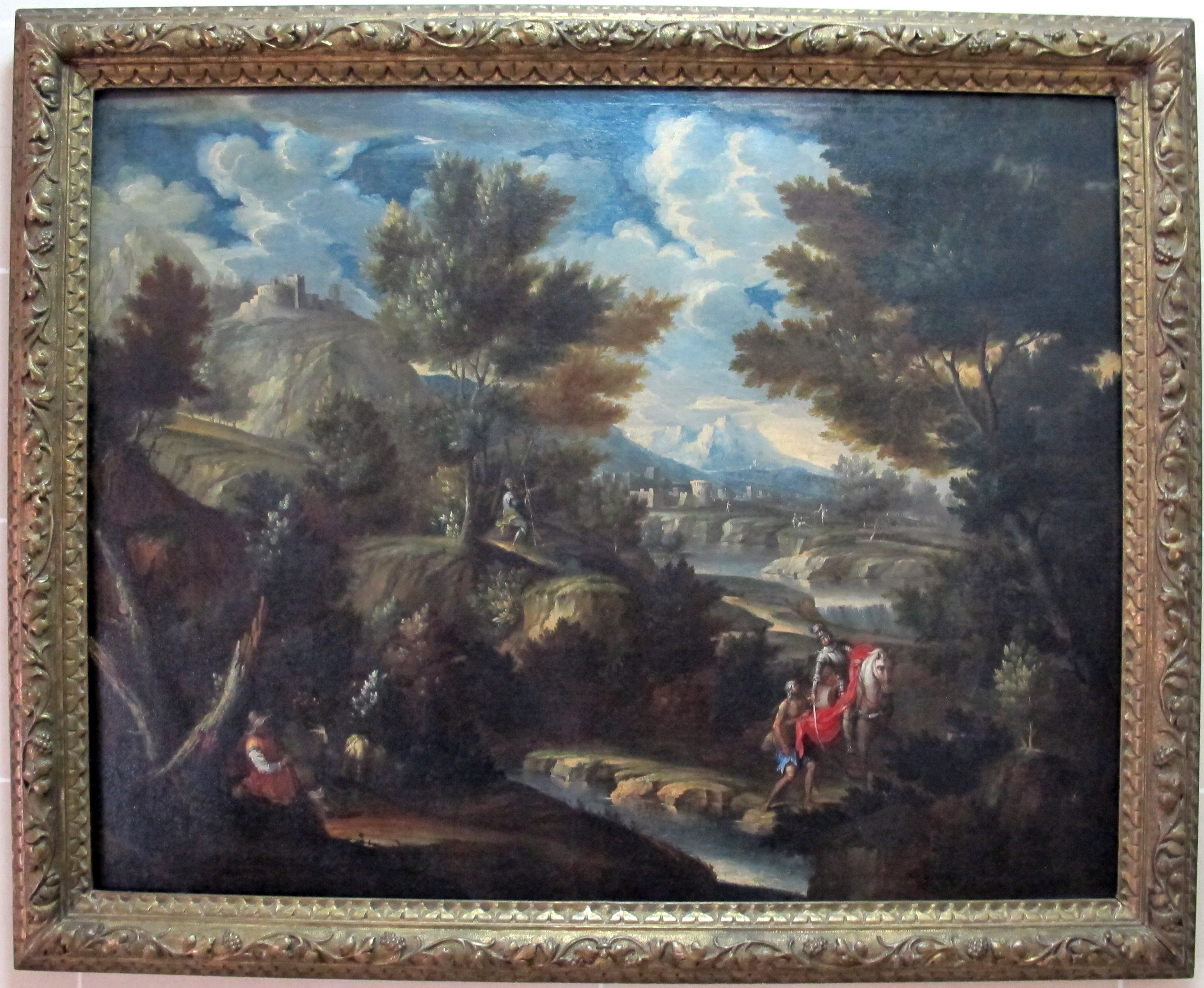
St. Martin, National Museum of Art of Romania

Pietro Montanini (1619–1689), also called Petruccio Perugino, was an Italian painter of the Baroque period. He was born in Perugia and first apprenticed with the painter Ciro Ferri, then Salvator Rosa. Among his pupils in Perugia were Mattia Battini (born 1666) and Giuseppe Laudati (born 1672). His canvas of St Francis Xavier was painted for the Capella Decemvirale in Perugia. Francesco Busti also contributed to this chapel. His nephew, Giovanni Fonticelli, was also a painter.
