= Giovanni Antonio Scaramuccia =

Italian painter

Madonna of the Rosary with St. Dominic and Blessed Columba of Rieti, Palazzo dei Priori, Perugia

Giovanni Antonio Scaramuccia (1580–1633) was an Italian painter, active mainly in Rome and Perugia.

== Biography ==
He initially trained as a sculptor, and was enrolled as a member of the Collegio di Pietra e Legname (the guild of stonemasons and woodworkers) in 1614. He is described as a pupil of Cristoforo Roncalli in Rome. Among his pupils were his son, Luigi Pellegrini Scaramuccia, Giovanni Domenico Cerrini and Paolo Gismondi.

He painted a series of panels depicting subjects of the New Testament for the Oratory of San Francesco in Perugia. He painted a mannerist Virgin and St Augustine (1625) for the Oratory of St Augustine in Perugia.
