= Fabio della Cornia =

Italian painter (1600–1643)

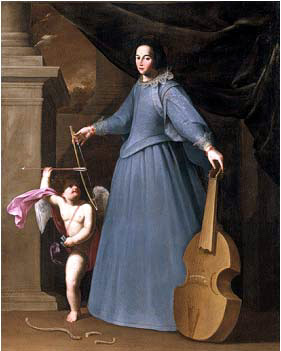
Fabio Della Corgna, portrait of Leonora Baroni (1611–1670)

Fabio della Corgna (1600 – 1643) was an Italian painter of the early Baroque. He was born in Perugia to the family of the Dukes of Castiglione del Lago (Lanzi states they were Dukes of Corgna, descendants of the condottiere Ascanio della Corgna), near Perugia. He attended the artists' academy of Stefano Amadei.

== Sources ==
- Boni, Filippo de' (1852). Biografia degli artisti ovvero dizionario della vita e delle opere dei pittori, degli scultori, degli intagliatori, dei tipografi e dei musici di ogni nazione che fiorirono da'tempi più remoti sino á nostri giorni. Seconda Edizione. Venice; Googlebooks: Presso Andrea Santini e Figlio. p. 228.
