= Bartolommeo Petrini =

Italian painter (1642–1664)

Bartolommeo Petrini (1642–1664) was an Italian painter of the late-Baroque period.

He was born in Perugia, and pupil of Luigi Scaramuccia. He travelled to Milan with Scaramuccia.
