= Ascanio della Corgna =

16th-century Italian condottiero

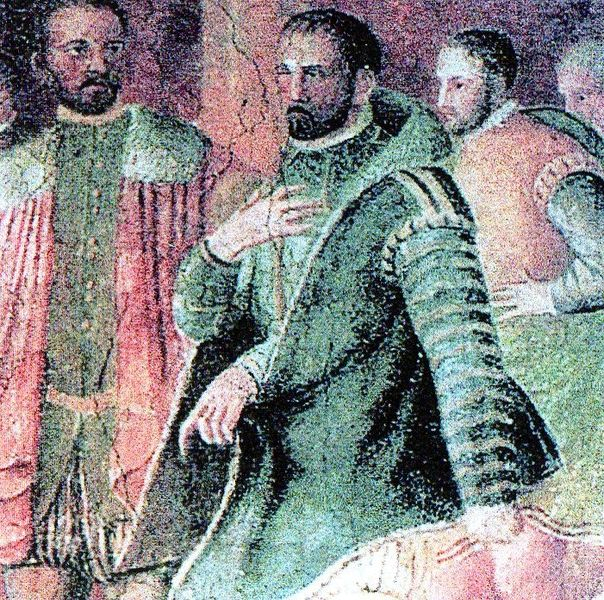
- Ascanio della Corgna, blind in his right eye.
- Born: 1516; Perugia, Papal States
- Died: 3 December 1571 (aged 54–55); Rome, Papal States
- Military career
- Allegiance: Kingdom of France; Republic of Venice; Spanish Empire; Holy Roman Empire
- Branch: Army
- Service years: 1532-1571
- Rank: Maestre de campo
- Units: Tercio de Nápoles; Tercio de Sicilia
- Awards: Order of Saint Stephen

Ascanio della Corgna (1516 – 3 December 1571) was an Italian condottiere and architect from Umbria. He rose to become Marchese di Castiglione del Lago, in part due to his family connections to a Pope.

Della Corgna was one of the foremost condottieri of his time, carving a multifaceted career as a commander, military architect and duelist. He was reported to be undefeated in singles fights and tournaments. He eventually became a maestre de campo for the Spanish tercios, serving in the Great Siege of Malta and the Battle of Lepanto among other exploits.

== Early life ==
Ascanio as a young man had followed his uncle to Rome, but his unbridled and violent temperament, disgusted his uncle, and he returned to Perugia. Ascanio was the brother of Cardinal Fulvio Giulio della Corgna, and both were nephews of Julius III, pope from 1550 to 1555.

== In the service of France ==
At 18 years old he was appointed castellan of Porta San Susanna, but he then became a mercenary for King Francis I of France through the mediation of Guido Rangoni. During the Italian War of 1536–1538, he served with distinction in the failed siege of Genoa in 1536 and the assault on Casale Monferrato that same year, but he was captured during the latter engagement, losing an eye to a Spanish soldier's lance thrust.

After being released through the intercession of the pro-Spanish condottiero Pirro Colonna, Della Corgna was ironically arrested by the French following a false accusation of treason leveled by a comrade, Ugo Carpegna. Once his innocence was established and he was released, Ascanio challenged Carpegna to a duel, where Carpegna saved his life only by surrendering and admitting his error. Shortly thereafter, Piero Strozzi brought Della Corgna back into the French ranks, leading to a brief campaign against Cosimo I de' Medici in Tuscany, but in 1537 he temporarily entered the service of the infantry-deficient Republic of Venice, storming the Turkish fortress of Castelnuovo di Cattaro under the command of Vincenzo Cappello. He subsequently inspected the fortifications of the Duchy of Parma for Pier Luigi Farnese and performed the same task for the French in Avignon. With the outbreak of the Italian War of 1542–1546, he participated in the Siege of Perpignan on Strozzi's personal recommendation, though the effort proved unsuccessful.

Upon returning to Italy, he was arrested by the Medici on charges of espionage, but was declared innocent and released for the second time in his career. In 1545, he switched sides and joined the faction of King of Spain and Holy Roman Emperor Charles V.

== In the service of Spain ==
In 1546, he worked on the fortifications of Casale for Charles V. There he famously challenged a young Tuscan nobleman in his unit, Giovanni Taddei, who had questioned his aptitude for the position. The duel took two months to arrange and generated immense public interest, so much so that Italians dubbed it il duello del secolo ("the duel of the century"). It finally took place on May 25 in Pitigliano, where the combatants faced off under unusual conditions: they were required to wield two swords of different lengths rather than the sword and dagger combination customary at the time. Hampered by his advanced age and his only eye, Ascanio was wounded during the fight, but managed to wound his opponent three times in the arm before ultimately killing him with a thrust to the torso.

Assigned to an allied papal force dispatched by Paul III, he marched under the command of Ottavio Farnese and Alessandro Vitelli to the Habsburg Netherlands, aiming to reinforce the imperial army in Germany against the Protestants during the Schmalkaldic War. In October 1550, seeking to expand his political influence over Perugia, he feigned to return to French service; he employed diplomatic efforts to persuade Francis I to assist his uncle, Pope Julius III, in reclaiming Parma, but these attempts proved unsuccessful. In fact, after being sent as an ambassador to the French court, he was accused there of espionage and the murder of a courtier, causing the mission to fail. Feeling the French were ungrateful, and despite their insistence that he remain at least in the Papal army, Ascanio definitively joined the Spanish ranks in 1552 under the auspices of Diego Hurtado de Mendoza, in time for the Italian War of 1551–1559.

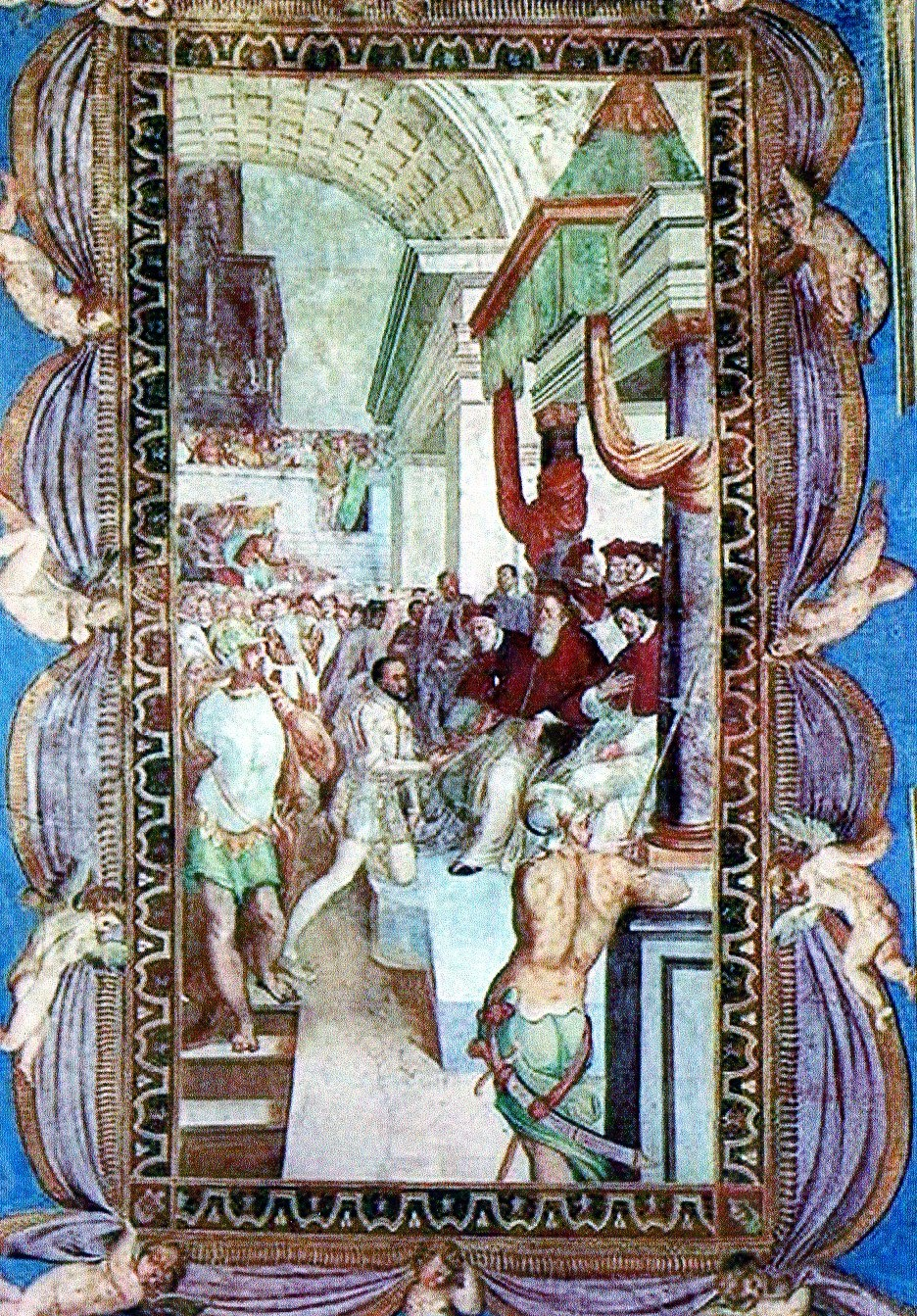
Ascanio and his uncle the Pope, by Niccolò Circignani.

=== Italian War of 1551-1559 ===
He fought for Emperor Charles at Lake Trasimeno and Siena, where Viceroy Pedro de Toledo placed him in the service of Cosme I de' Medici in 1553. There Della Corgna was so severely wounded that he was presumed dead, an event that prompted Pope Julius III to turn against the Sienese. Upon his return, he served under another great Italian general of the tercios, Gian Giacomo Medici. Ascanio contacted a condottiero whose life he had once saved, Santuccio da Cutigliano, hoping to have the gates of Chiusi opened to him in exchange for a large reward, but Della Corgna was betrayed and handed over to the French. The French commander, Piero Strozzi, treated him courteously, but following an escape attempt, Della Corgna was sent to King Henry II of France under tighter security. As a gesture of respect toward the Pope, Henry II granted him his freedom in December 1554, allowing him to return to Rome without ransom on the condition that he withdraw from the war and later join the French side, a promise Della Corgna did not keep.

His prospects within the papal ranks were ruined by the 1555 election of Paul IV, who was virulently anti-Spanish and a rival of Ascanio's brother, Cardinal Fulvio della Corgna. Ascanio sought a way out of Rome, looking for support from Tuscany and Venice, and ultimately from Spain. Paul had sent him to reinforce the papal strongholds in preparation for the war against Charles V, but discovered that Ascanio was actually conspiring with a Spanish diplomat, Garcilaso de la Vega (not to be confused with the poet Garcilaso, dead by then). Consequently, Ascanio was forced to flee the city in July 1556. With his family disgraced and himself excommunicated, he contacted Marcantonio Colonna to seek refuge in Naples, where he placed himself under the protection of the viceroy, Fernando Álvarez de Toledo, Duke of Alba. After working on the Neapolitan fortifications in Abruzzo, he was appointed maestre de campo and granted great honors by Alba, and was sent to secure the Ostia area. He also assisted Colonna until the Pope signed a peace treaty.

=== Ottoman-Habsburg wars ===
Following the war, he undertook various defensive architecture projects in the Spanish Netherlands, now ruled by King Philip II, and for the Papal States, aided by the pro-Spanish stance of the next pope, Pius IV, brother to Gian Giacomo Medici, who had lifted the sanctions previously imposed on Della Corgna. In 1561, he was inducted into the Order of Saint Stephen, established by the Medici dukes. Five years later, however, his subjects in the Marquisate of Castiglione accused him of abuses, crimes, and fiscal rapacity, leading the pope to have him imprisoned. The ensuing trial attracted international attention; he was eventually released in exchange for a large sum of money and through the intercession of various figures, including the monarchs of Spain and France, Emperor Ferdinand I, Grand Master Hospitaller Jean Parisot de Valette, and Viceroy of Sicily García de Toledo. The latter also required his services to fortify Hospitaller Malta in anticipation of the looming Ottoman siege of 1565. Ascanio subsequently participated in the relief effort alongside Álvaro de Sande.

Upon his return to Italy in 1566, he received significant favors from Philip II, sparking controversy among those who viewed him as a troublesome figure. He was imprisoned again by the new pope, Pius V, for his involvement in a political assassination. He was acquitted the following year after appealing to another of his contacts, Girolamo Priuli, by then the Doge of Venice. Negotiations took place in 1569 regarding a campaign against the Turks in the service of Venice, but the project did not come to fruition. Pursuing the same objective, Ascanio then joined the Holy League of 1571, serving on the council of John of Austria. Wary of naval warfare, he advocated for a land-based campaign, but the conflict was ultimately decided by the naval battle of Lepanto. He fought aboard Giovanni Andrea Doria's flagship galley, also meeting Miguel de Cervantes.

After that, he returned to inspect the Turkish fortress of Santa Maura for a future assault, but an illness contracted at Lepanto forced him to return to Rome, where he was not well received by the pope because of his defense of the opinions of Doria, whom Pius V had accused of cowardice and treason. His illness did not improve, and Della Corgna died in Rome. His body was transported with honors to Perugia, and was conducted to a hero's funeral in Umbria. Ascanio had commissioned the Palazzo della Corgna built at Castiglione del Lago.

== Issue ==
Ascanio had no direct heirs, and his title and property passed on to his nephew, Diomede della Corgna. Both Ascanio and his heirs frescoed the interiors with mythologic and historic scenes, some depicting the feats of Ascanio.

His offspring did not match his stature, and they were deposed from their estates in the mid-17th-century.

== Bibliography ==
- Maria Gabriella Donati-Guerrieri, Lo Stato di Castiglione del Lago e i della Corgna, La Grafica, Perugia 1972
- Guido Lana, Ascanio I della Corgna ed il suo tempo, Nuova Stampa, Castiglione del Lago 1999.
