= Andrea Procaccini =

Italian painter (1671–1734)

- Mystic Marriage of Saint Catherine of Alexandria (1690)
- Born: 14 January 1671; Rome, Papal States
- Died: 24 June 1734 (aged 63); Real Sitio de San Ildefonso, Spain
- Education: Carlo Maratta
- Known for: Painting, architecture
- Movement: Baroque

Andrea Procaccini (14 January 1671 – 24 June 1734) was an Italian painter of the Baroque period, active in Rome as well as in Spain. He painted for the royal family of Philip V for over a decade.

== Biography ==
=== Early career ===
Procaccini was born in Rome on 14 January 1671. He trained in the studio of Carlo Maratta. In his early career, Procaccini painted mostly religious works. Pope Pius V Triumphant over the Turks (1712; Rome, Santa Maria sopra Minerva) is his best-known altarpiece. In 1715 he was listed among the members of the Accademia di San Luca, and in 1718 he frescoed the prophet Daniel in the main nave of San Giovanni in Laterano, Rome. Procaccini also assisted in the establishment of the papal tapestry factory.

In 1720 Philip V of Spain, was seeking an Italian portrait painter and chose Procaccini. Before leaving Italy Procaccini painted Aurora (Rome, Palazzo Carolis), which has a light composition with landscape details that recall Reni’s Aurora (1614; Rome, Palazzo Pallavicini-Rospigliosi), and a much-praised St. Cecilia intended as a gift for Pope Clement XI. During his journey to Spain he stopped at Parma, where he executed a drawing of Angelica and Medoro (Galleria nazionale di Parma), at Pontremoli, leaving there a Crucifixion (Pontremoli, San Francesco), and in Genoa, where he frescoed three ceilings in the Palazzo Durazzo-Pallavicini.

=== In Spain ===
In Spain Procaccini worked as a decorator and architect as well as a painter of frescoes and portraits. In 1722 he acted as intermediary in purchasing 124 pictures from Maratta’s collection for the King, whom in 1724 he also induced to buy the collection of marble sculptures, formerly owned by Christina, Queen of Sweden. These purchases were intended to embellish the new Royal Palace of La Granja de San Ildefonso. For this project, Procaccini trained himself as an architect (1726). He added four parallel wings to the original building, tripled the east façade, built new rectangular courtyards and the coach courtyard and connected the Colegiata to nearby buildings, thereby transforming the simple Alcázar by Teodoro Ardemans into a new palace obviously influenced by Italian art.

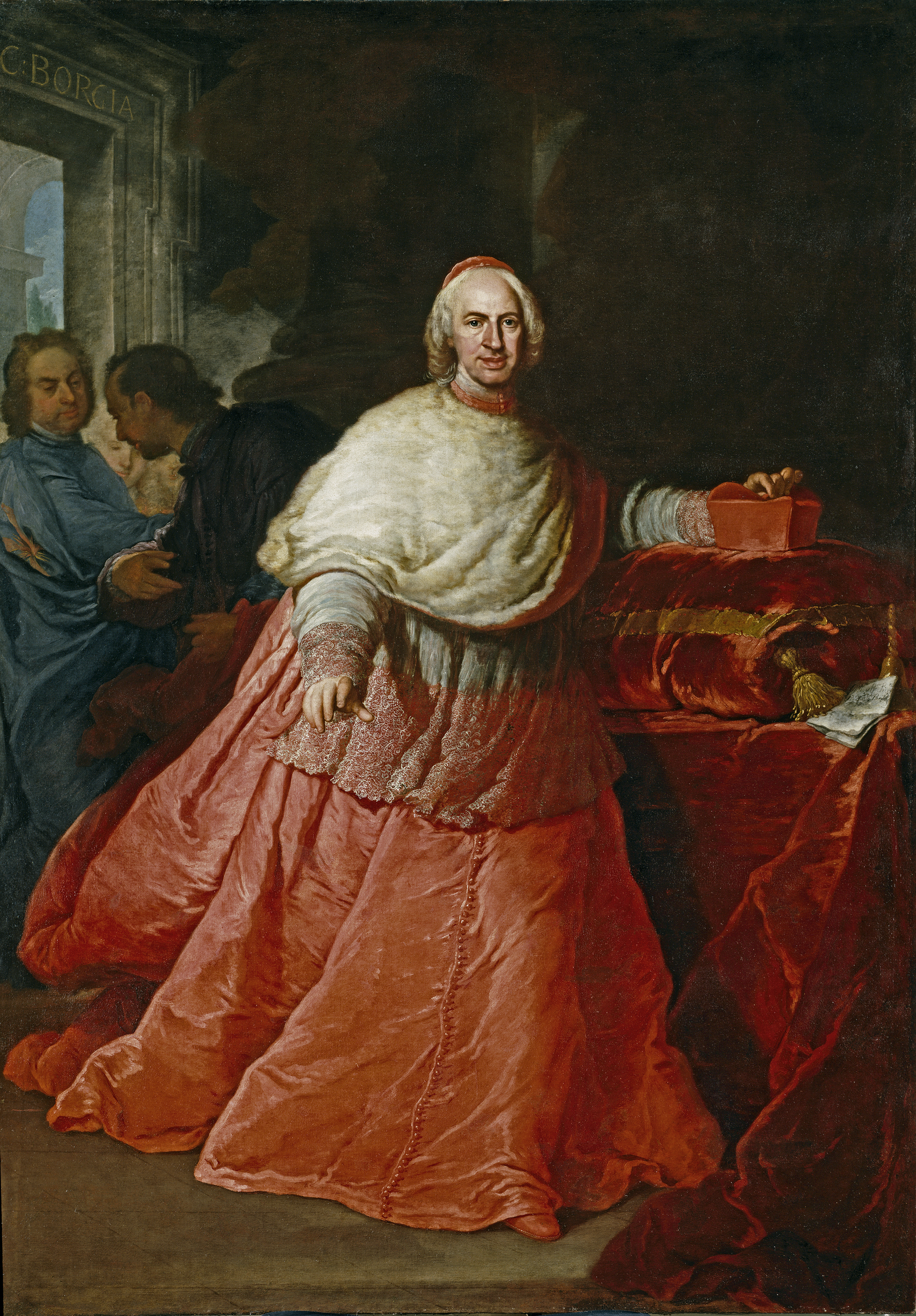
Portrait of Cardinal Borja, Museo del Prado, Madrid

Very few of Procaccini’s Spanish paintings have survived, but they (and his working method) can be traced through his numerous preparatory drawings, which show that his style did not change through the years. The portrait of Cardinal Carlos de Borja y Centellas (c. 1720–30; Madrid, Museo del Prado), in the style of Maratta, is his most remarkable work and reveals his psychological insight, originality and technical ability. Also notable are Erminia and the Shepherds, the Still-life with Figures (both c. 1720–30; Riofrío, Royal Palace) and Oran Castles (1732–4; Madrid, Patrimonio Nacional). The composition of Our Lady of the Rosary (1724; La Granja de San Ildefonso, Nuestra Señora del Rosario) and the Granting of the Chasuble to St. Ildefonso (La Granja de San Ildefonso, Real Colegiata), his last, unfinished work, is in a lighter style with a tendency to Rococo and shows little originality.

As superintendent of the tapestry factory in Seville, 1730–33, he apparently drew cartoons depicting Don Quixote (cartoons destr.; tapestries, Madrid, Patrimonio Nacional), working with Domenico Maria Sani (1690–1773). Procaccini died at San Ildefonso on 24 June 1734. In 1775 His widow sold his rich collection of drawings by his own hand, by Maratta and by others to the Royal Academy of Fine Arts of San Fernando, Madrid.
