= Zappi =

Zappi may refer to

- Monte Zappi, a peak in central Italy
- Daniela Cristina Zappi (born 1965), Brazilian botanist
- Ettore Zappi (1904–1986), Italian-American mafiosi
- Faustina Maratti Zappi (c. 1679–1745), Italian Baroque poet and painter
- Giambattista Felice Zappi (1667–1719), Italian poet
- Werner "Zappi" Diermaier, German drummer
