= Silvestro Mattei =

Italian painter

Silvestro Mattei (1653–1739) was a painter of the Baroque period from the Papal States, born and active in Rome and Ascoli Piceno.

== Biography ==
He was born in Ascoli and had been sent by his father to be a pupil of Carlo Maratta in Rome. He painted two canvases, Virgin of Soccorso and Virgin with Saints Monica and the Blessed Rita da Cassia and Blessed Chiara di Montefalco for the church of Sant'Agostino in Ascoli.
