= Oratorio del Rosario di Santa Cita, Palermo =

Prayer room or oratory in Palermo, Italy

Oratory of the Rosary of Saint Cita
- Oratorio del Rosario di Santa Cita
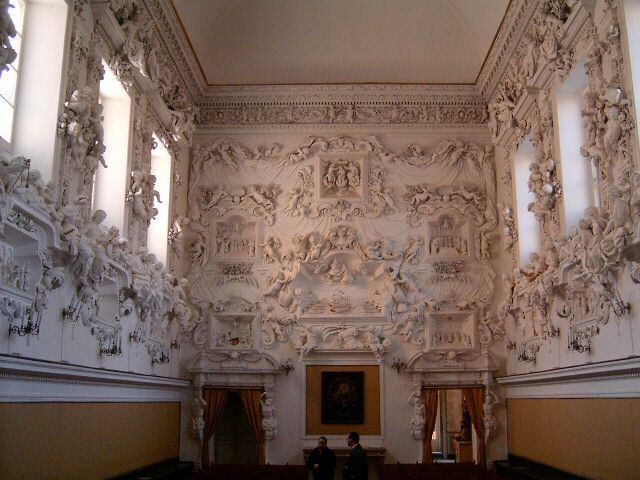

Religion
- Affiliation: Roman Catholic
- Province: Archdiocese of Palermo
- Rite: Roman Rite

Location
- Location: Palermo, Italy
- Interactive map of Oratory of the Rosary of Saint Cita
- Coordinates: 38°07′15″N 13°21′47″E

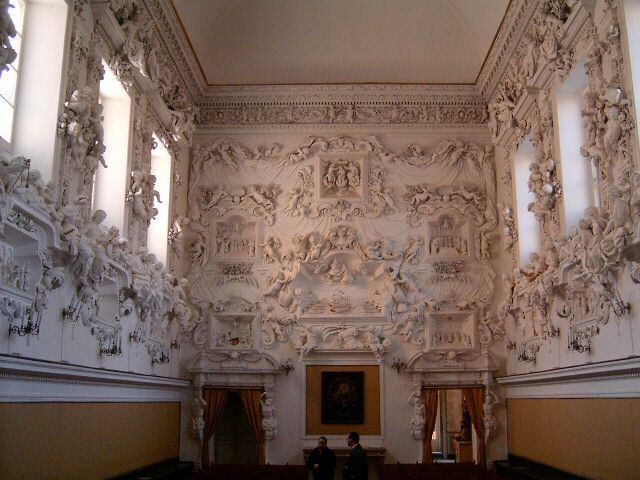
Oratorio di Santa Cita

The Oratorio del Rosario di Santa Cita is a Baroque prayer room or oratory located in the quarter of the Castellammare within the historic center of Palermo, region of Sicily, Italy. The site is best known for the remarkable stucco tableaux scenes composed during 1687-1718 by Giacomo Serpotta.

== History ==
This Confraternity or Compagnia del Rosario was founded in 1570 by a group of prominent or aristocratic members deriving from the Confraternity of San Domenico, with the distinct Oratory of the Rosary of San Domenico. After location at another site in town, they moved to this site near the church of Santa Cita.

The exterior of the oratory has stone accents for windows and pilasters. The entry portal has a coat of arms with an apparent tree. Anterooms to the main oratory hall have portraits of the former directors of the confraternity. The two entrance doors to the main hall are flanked by stucco telamons. The side walls are rich in decorations with floral elements and playful and individualized sets of putti. Panels depict small theatrical tableaux intended for contemplation collectively known as the fifteen Mysteries of the Rosary, which are comprised by the

- Joyful Mysteries: 1) Annunciation; 2) Visitation; 3) Nativity; 4) Presentation of Jesus at the Temple; and 5) Jesus at the Temple.
- Luminous Mysteries: 1) Baptism of Jesus in the Jordan; 2) Wedding at Cana; 3) Sermon proclaiming Kingdom of God; 4) Transfiguration; and 5) Institution of the Eucharist.
- Sorrowful Mysteries: 1) Jesus in the Garden of Gesthemane; 2) Scourging at the Pillar; 3) Crowning with Thorns; 4) Carrying of the Cross; and 5) Crucifixion.

The main altarpiece depicts a Madonna of the Rosary and Child with Dominican Saints (1695) painted in Rome for this oratory by Carlo Maratta. The painting cost 1500 scudi. This Marian veneration, depicted in the clouds above the battle, is claimed to have aided the Christian naval forces during the Battle of Lepanto. This battle is depicted in a large stucco panel by Serpotta above the altar. Flanking the arch framing the altarpiece are two Old Testament female heroes: Judith and Esther, who highlight the fortitude and loyalty attributed to the Marian veneration of the Madonna of the Rosary. A nearby chapel has an Adoration of the Mystical Lamb by Filippo Tancredi.

== Gallery ==
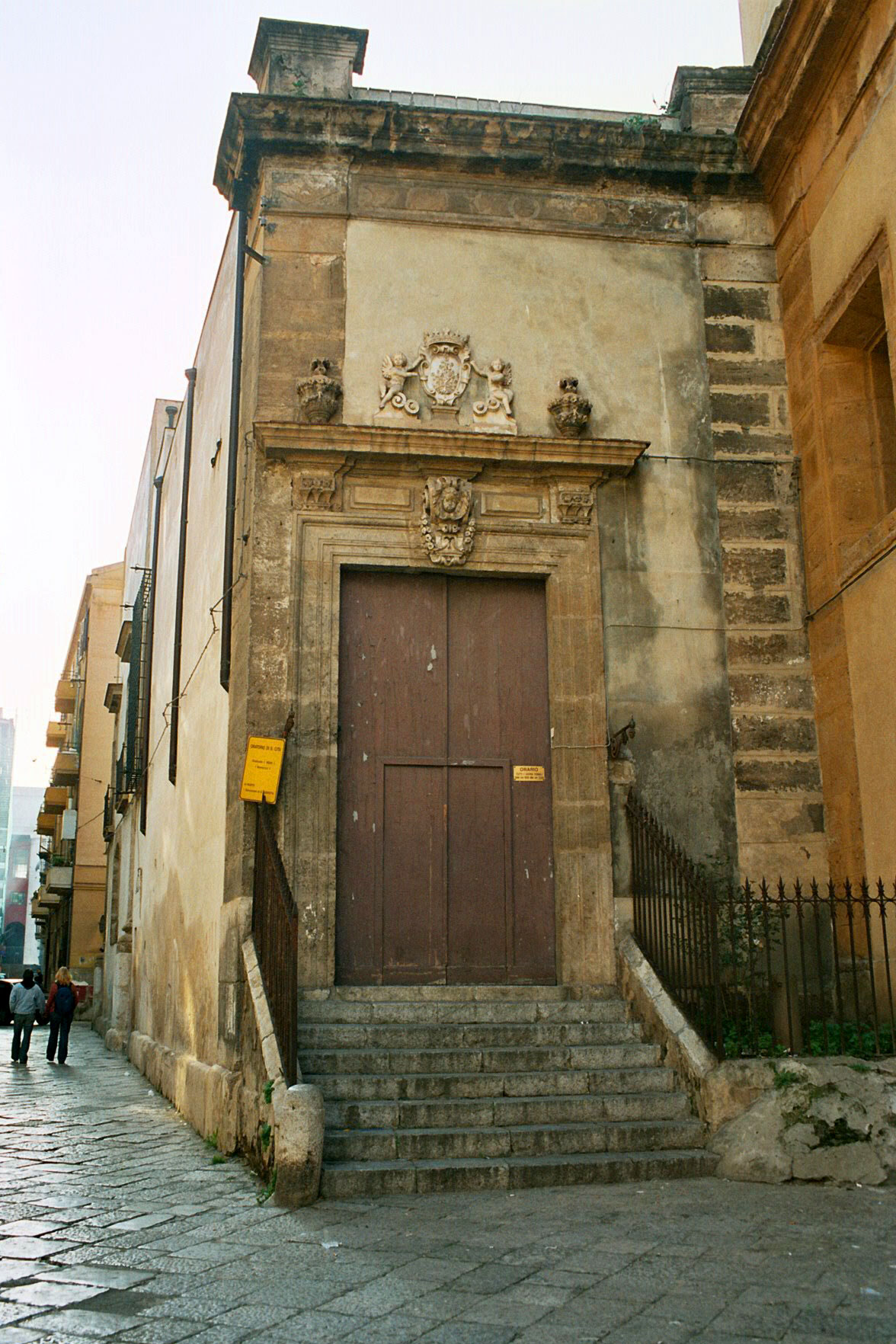

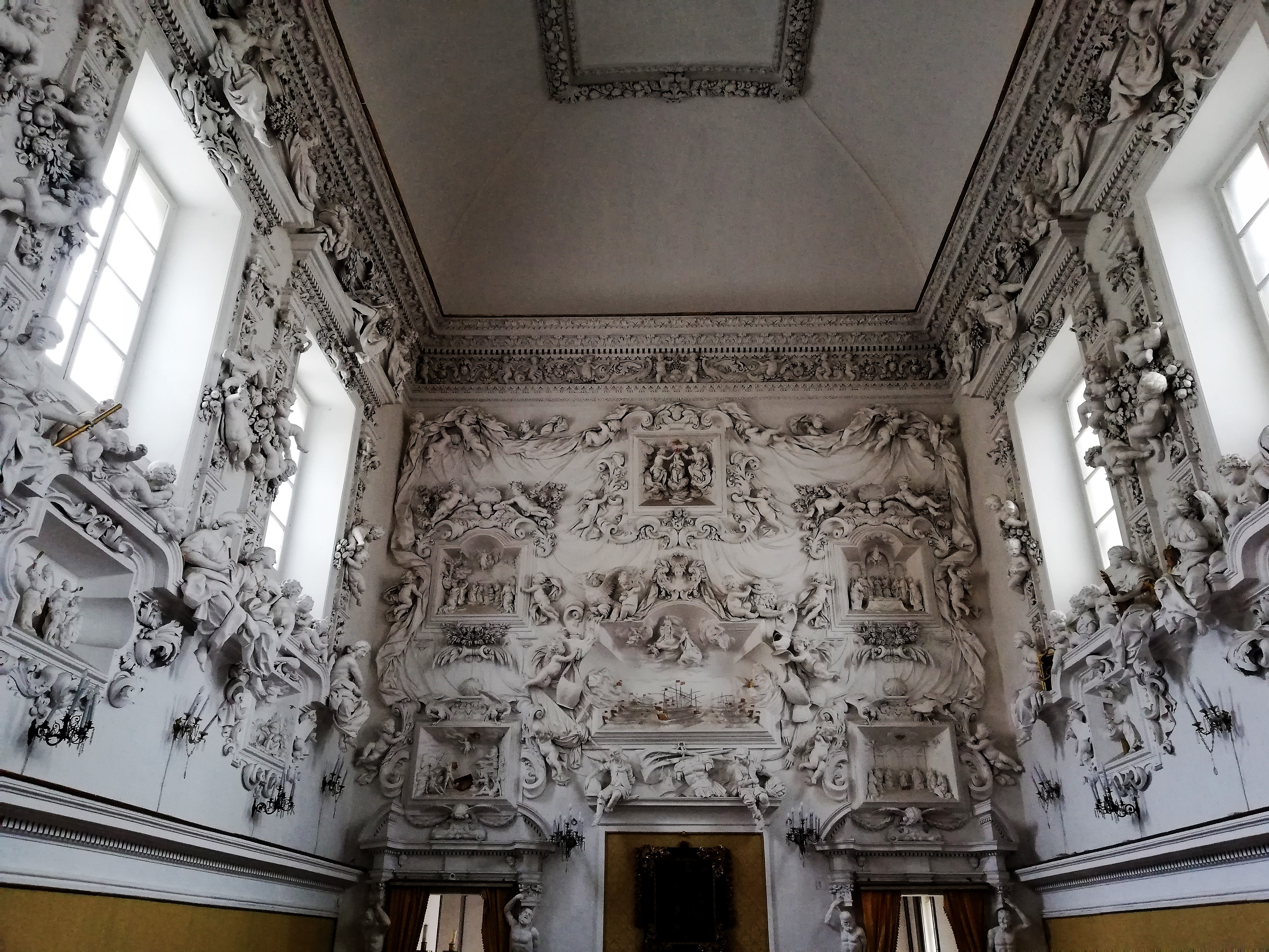
Counterfacade

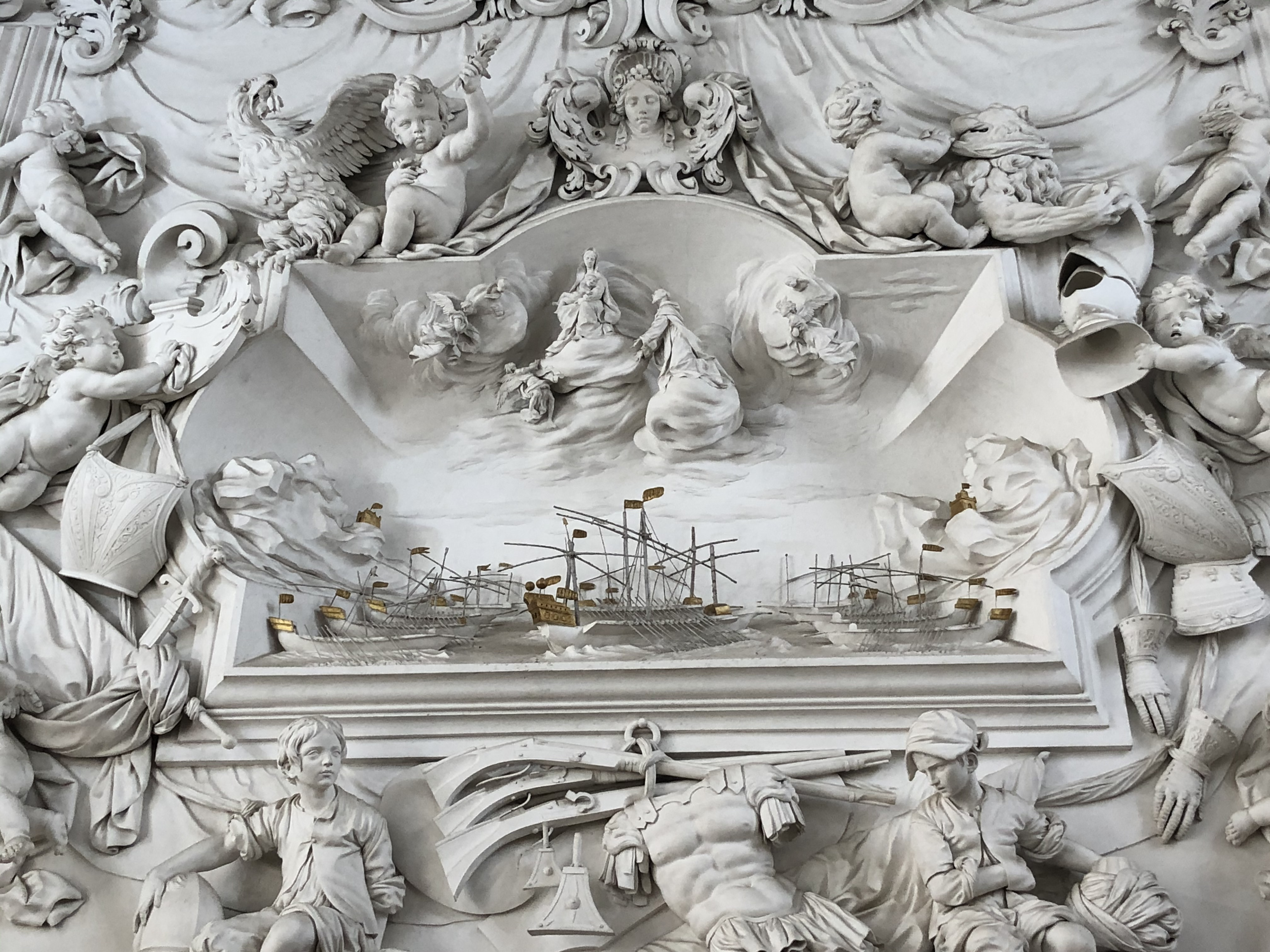
Madonna of Lepanto above Battle of Lepanto

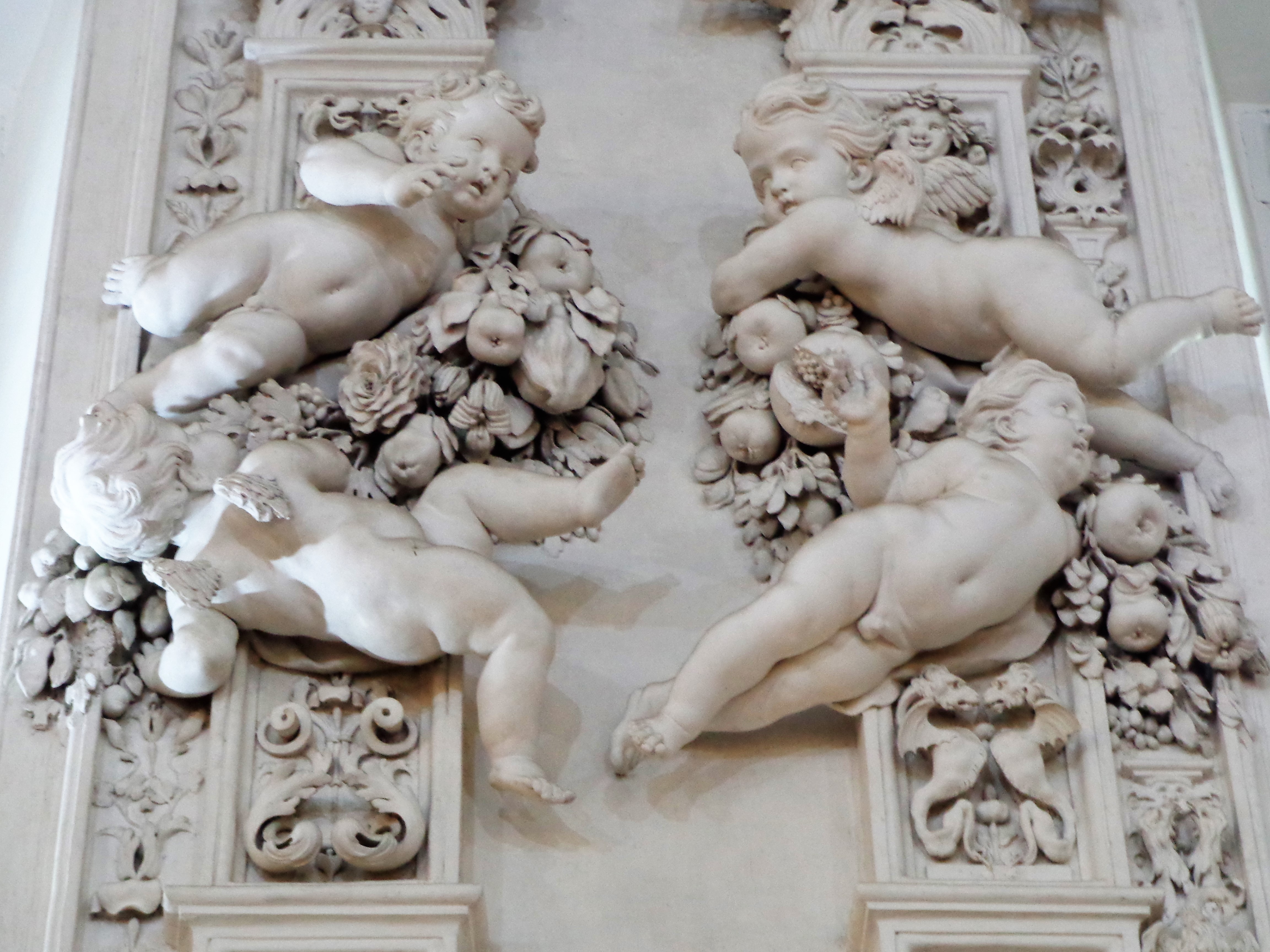
Putti

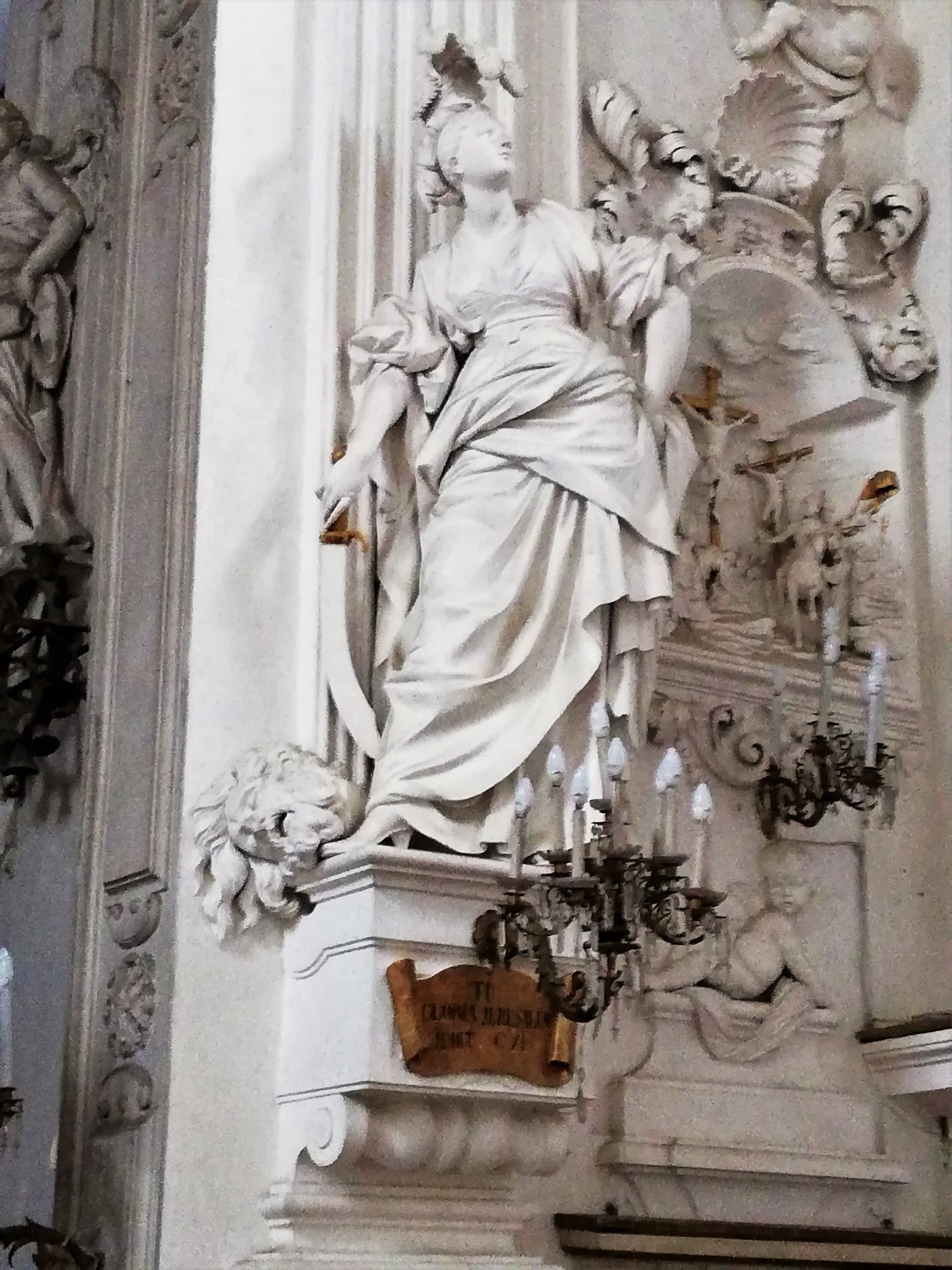
Judith or Allegory of Fortitude

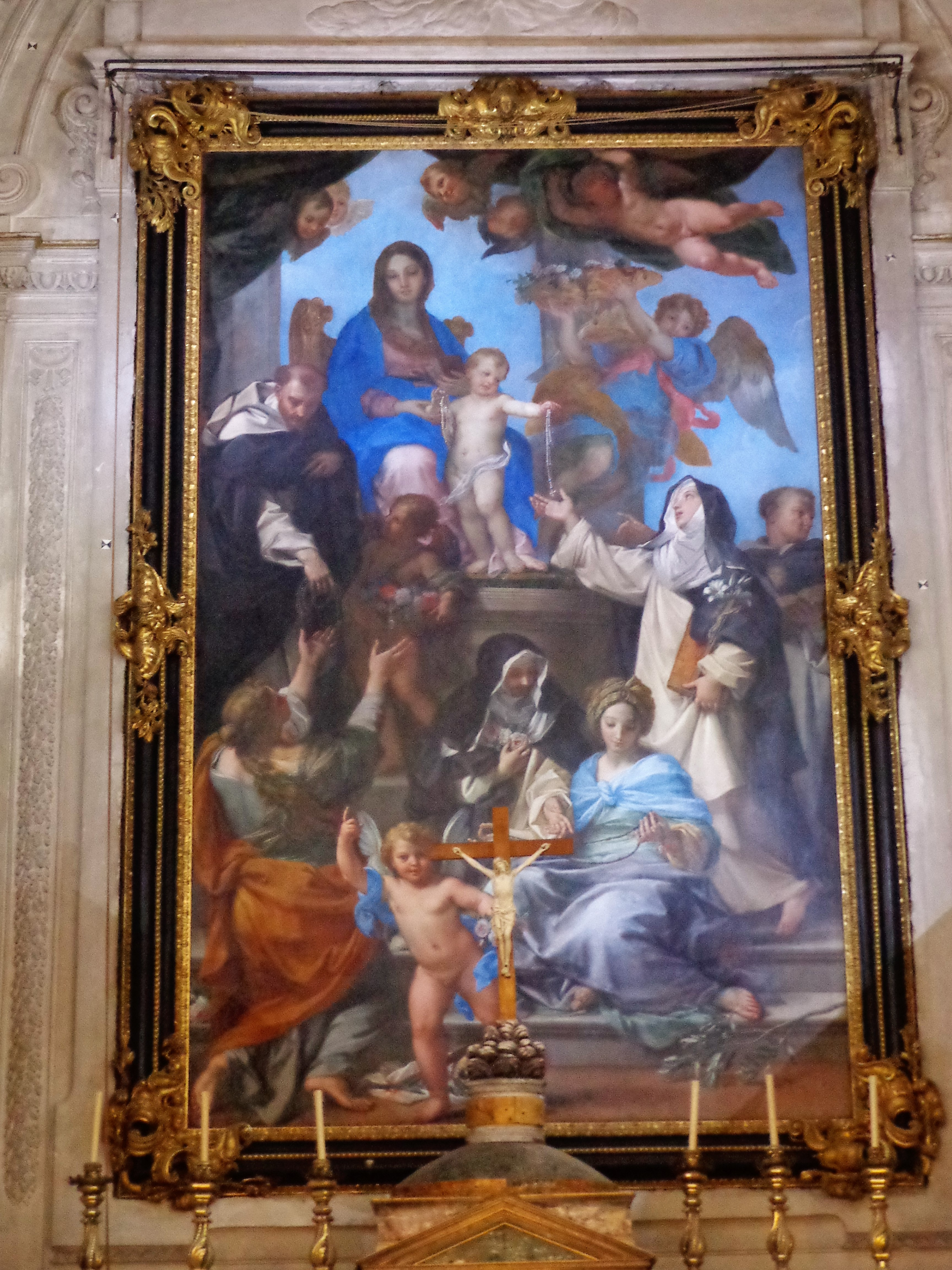
Maratta altarpiece

== Literature ==
Donald Garstang: Giacomo Serpotta and the Stuccatori of Palermo 1560-1790 (London, 1984)
