= Rebecca and Eliezer at the Well =

Painting by Carlo Maratta

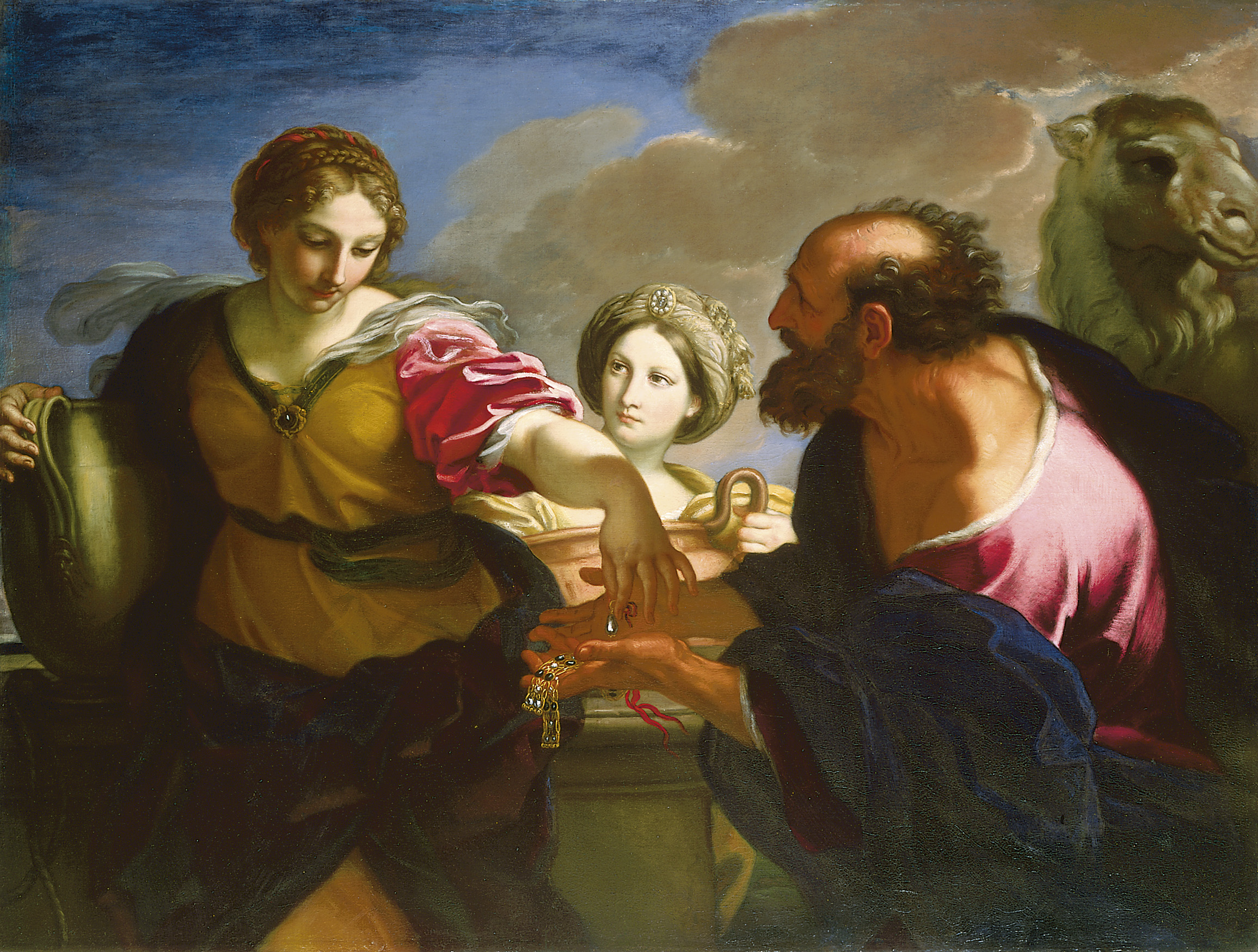
- Artist: Carlo Maratta
- Year: 1655-57
- Type: Oil painting on canvas
- Dimensions: 120 cm × 160 cm (47 in × 62 in)
- Location: Indianapolis Museum of Art, Indianapolis

Rebecca and Eliezer at the Well is an oil painting by Italian artist Carlo Maratta, located in the Indianapolis Museum of Art, which is in Indianapolis, Indiana. It shows the story of Abraham's servant Eliezer giving Rebecca jewels to seal her betrothal to Isaac, after she had demonstrated the kindness foreseen by Abraham in offering water to Eliezer's camels (Gen. 24:11-20).

== Description ==
Maratta reduces the story to its most essential elements, limiting the number of participants in the narrative to the bare minimum for maximum clarity, in accordance with classical traditions. Thus, rather than the usual beauty pageant portrayed by artists depicting this biblical scene, Maratta shows only Eliezer, Rebecca, and one other woman against whom the viewer may contrast Rebecca's beauty and virtue. Maratta also reduces the figures to half-length, the better to focus on their dramatic facial expressions.

The image is full of visual cues that make it clear this is an Old Testament prefiguration of Mary's selection. The pearl Rebecca selects stands for Mary's value and purity. The vases she and the other woman hold are symbols of Mary's role as a holy vessel. Since the vases are unbroken, they also stand for her virginity. Maratta was famed for his paintings of Mary, and he gave Rebecca the same serenity and languid, classical beauty as the Virgin Mother.

=== Acquisition ===
The IMA acquired this work in 1988 with the help of the Alicia Ballard Fine Arts Purchase Fund. It currently hangs in the Jane H. Fortune Gallery and has the accession number 1988.70.

== See also ==
- Annunciation in Christian art
