= The Emperor Augustus Closes the Doors of the Temple of Janus =

Painting by Carlo Maratta

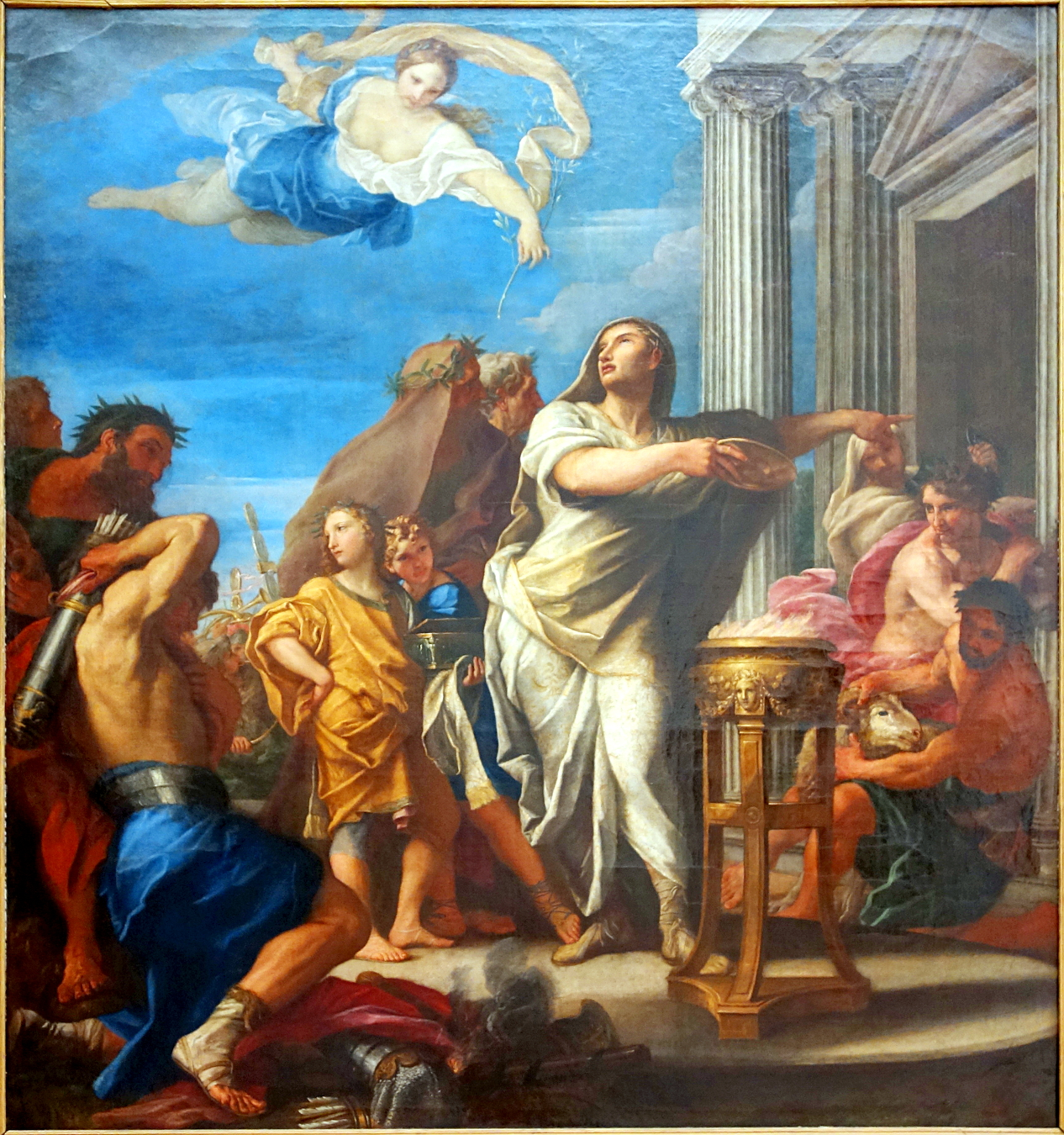
The Emperor Augustus Closes the Doors of the Temple of Janus (c. 1655-1657) by Carlo Maratta

The Emperor Augustus Closes the Doors of the Temple of Janus or The Peace of Augustus is a c.1655-1657 oil on canvas painting by Carlo Maratta, one of nine works commissioned by Louis Phélypeaux, Seigneur of La Vrillière for the gilded gallery at his new hôtel de La Vrillière in Paris. It is now in the Palais des Beaux-Arts de Lille.

It shows a personification of Peace holding an olive branch appearing to Augustus as he prepares a burnt offering on a tripod and points at the doors of the Temple of Janus to the right, with an archer taking off his quiver to the left. The doors were closed in 13 BC to mark total peace throughout the Roman Empire (specifically the pacification of Spain and Germany) and the start of the Pax Romana, an event also marked that year by the construction of the Ara Pacis. Augustus had also closed that temple's doors in 29 and 25 BC, whereas they had only previously been closed twice between the foundation of Rome and his birth.
