= Madonna of the Rosary (Maratta, Palermo) =

Painting by Carlo Maratta

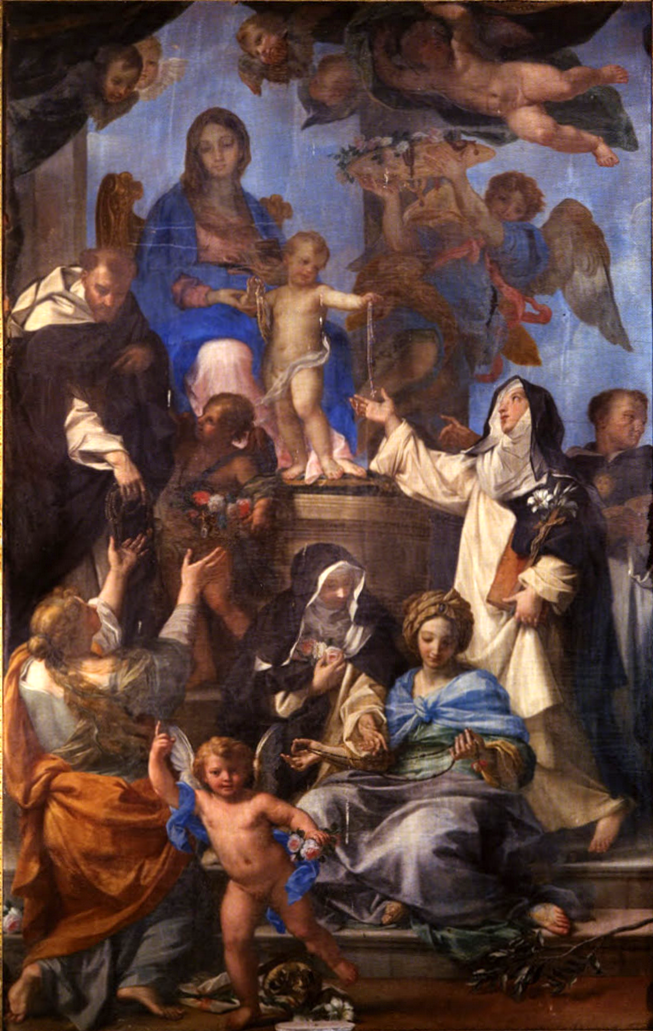
- Madonna of the Rosary by Carlo Maratta
- Artist: Carlo Maratta
- Year: 1655-57
- Type: Oil painting on canvas
- Dimensions: 120 cm × 160 cm (47 in × 62 in)
- Location: Oratorio di Santa Cita, Palermo

The Madonna of the Rosary is an altarpiece painted in oil by Italian artist Carlo Maratta, located in the Oratory of San Cita for which it was painted, in Palermo, region of Sicily, Italy.

== Description ==
The altarpiece depicts a somewhat aloof Madonna, dressed in a bright blue robe, sits on a gilded chair, with the child Jesus each dropping rosaries to their intermediaries: the Dominican saints Dominic (founder of order) and Catherine of Siena. Dominic, with a tonsure and nearest to the Virgin, passes on the rosary to the people. Catherine, holding a Lily and an early follower of Dominic, also stands and receives the rosary from a child Jesus. Both Dominic and Catherine claimed to have had visions of the Madonna and Jesus.

In the middle, below Jesus is another Dominican nun, holding roses to her chest and conversing with a young woman; this likely represents St Rose of Lima, but could be misinterpreted as Santa Rosalia. Rosalia, one of the female patron saints of Palermo, lived in paleochristian era, hence never a Dominican nun. To the right of Catherine, with a gilded sun on his chest, is Thomas Aquinas, one of the Doctors of the church and also a Dominican friar.

The confraternity of the oratory for which the painting was made, had split off from the confraternity of the Rosary of San Domenico, both affiliated with the Dominican order, which was powerful in Spain at the time. Maratta, then in Rome, was paid the princely sum of 1500 scudi for the painting. An etched mirror copy of this painting by the Flemish artist Robert van Audenaerde (1663–1743) is owned by the National Gallery of Scotland, where it is described as Madonna of the Rosary with Saints Thomas Aquinas, Rosalia, Catherine of Siena, Dominic and Oliva.
