= Carlo Maratta =

Italian painter (1625–1713)

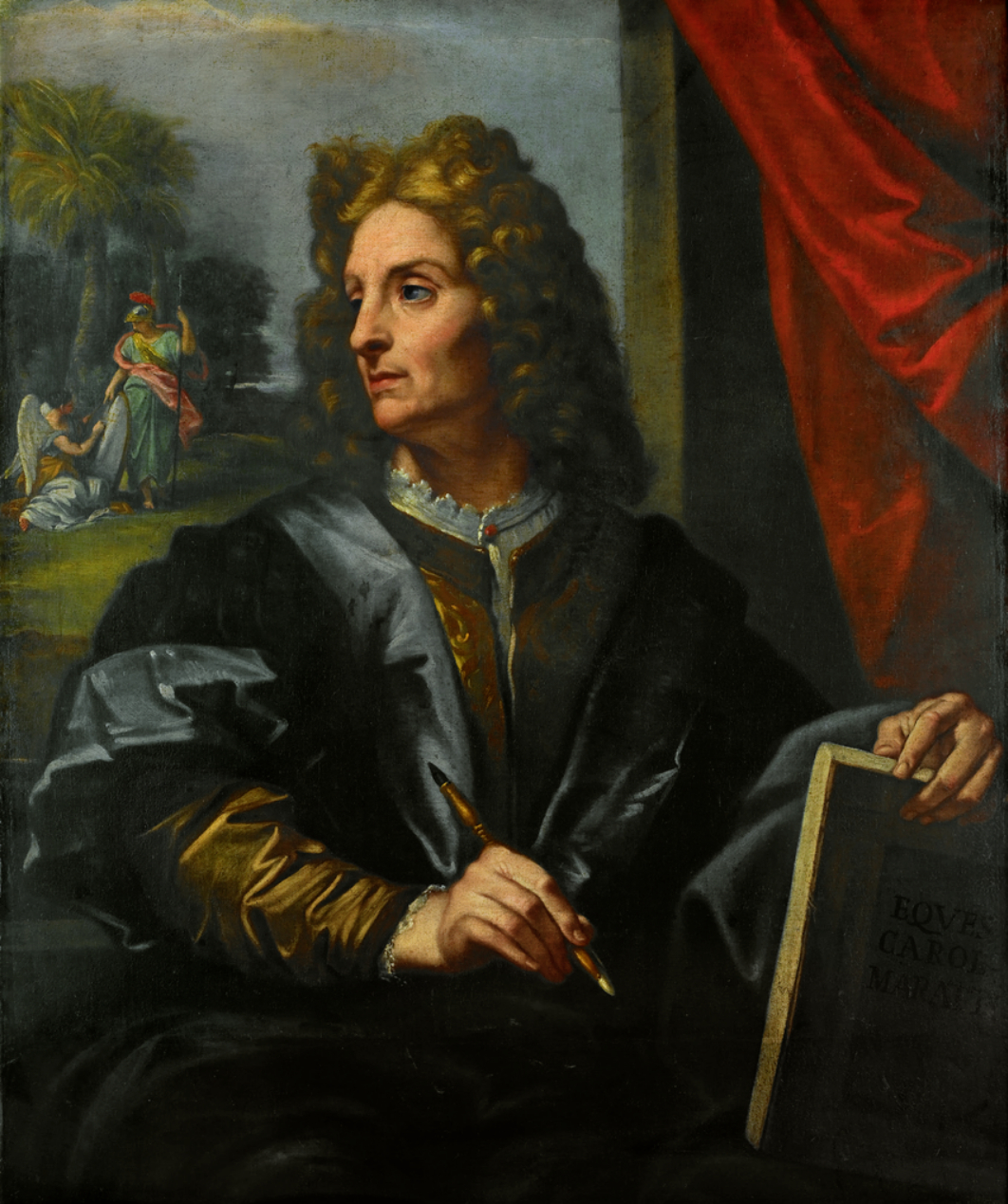
- Self-Portrait (1690), Royal Museums of Fine Arts of Belgium, Brussels
- Born: 18 May 1625; Camerano, Papal States
- Died: 15 December 1713 (aged 88); Rome, Papal States
- Education: Andrea Sacchi
- Known for: Painting, drawing
- Notable work: The Emperor Augustus Closes the Doors of the Temple of Janus (1655–1657); Rebecca and Eliezer at the Well (1655–57); Madonna of the Rosary (1655–57)
- Movement: Baroque
- Spouses: Francesca Trulli (m. 1658; died 1698) Francesca Gommi (m. 1700)
- Children: Faustina Maratti

Carlo Maratta or Maratti (18 May 1625 – 15 December 1713) was an Italian Baroque painter and draughtsman, active principally in Rome where he was the leading painter in the second half of the 17th century. He was a fresco and canvas painter who painted in a wide range of genres, including history and portrait painting. He is the leading representative of the classicizing style in the Italian Late Baroque. He worked for prominent clients in Rome, including various popes.

== Biography ==
=== Early life and education ===
The principal contemporary source on Maratta's life is the biography written by his friend, Giovanni Pietro Bellori published in 1732 in Rome under the title Vita di Carlo Maratti pittore (Life of the painter Carlo Maratti). Maratta was born on 18 May 1625 in Camerano (Marche), then part of the Papal States, as the son of Tommaso and Faustina Masini. He moved to Rome in 1636 in the company of family friend Don Corintio Benicampi, secretary to Taddeo Barberini who was a nephew of pope Urbano VIII and brother of Cardinals Francesco Barberini and Antonio Barberini. He had been encouraged to do so by the painter Andrea Camassei, who had seen the young Maratta's drawings. In Rome he was then hosted by his half-brother Bernabeo Francioni, an unsuccessful painter. Bernabeo introduced him to Andrea Sacchi, whose workshop he entered in 1637. He developed a close relationship with Sacchi and would remain in his workshop until his master's death in 1661.

Maratta followed the usual practice of Roman studios, making copies after the Antique and after the celebrated works of the Renaissance and early 17th century. He also attended the theoretical discussions that took place at Sacchi's studio, where the most eminent Roman artists gathered and drew from life. In 1636 a debate between Sacchi and Pietro da Cortona, then the leading Roman painters, took place at the Accademia di San Luca, the academy of artists in Rome. Sacchi argued that paintings should only have a few figures which should express the narrative whereas Cortona countered that a greater number of figures allowed for the development of sub themes. Maratta's painting at this time was close to the classicism espoused by Sacchi and was far more restrained and composed than the Baroque exuberance of Pietro da Cortona's paintings. Like Sacchi, his paintings were inspired by the works of the great painters from Parma and Bologna: Annibale Carracci, Guercino, Guido Reni, Francesco Albani, and Giovanni Lanfranco.

=== Early career, to 1661 ===
Maratta’s earliest works are untraced: Bellori cited two half-figures of St. Peter and St. Paul, a David Victorious and an Assumption of the Virgin, painted for Benicampi, and, presumably through the mediation of Benicampi, a Birth of the Virgin for a convent in Nocera Umbra. The earliest surviving work is the Glory of Saints (1645; Monterotondo Cathedral), commissioned by Taddeo Barberini before his departure for France in 1645. It was probably around 1646 to 1648 that Maratta undertook a journey to Camerano and Ancona in the Marche, during which he was able to see works by Titian and by local artists.

His fresco of Constantine ordering the Destruction of Pagan Idols (1648) for the Baptistery of Saint John Lateran, based on designs by Sacchi, gained him attention as an artist. Maratta’s first independent public work in Rome, in which he first moved away from Sacchi’s dominance, is the Adoration of the Shepherds (1650) for the church of San Giuseppe dei Falegnami. The female figure, with its large eyes and oval face framed by strands of dark hair, was characteristic of the painter’s early phase.

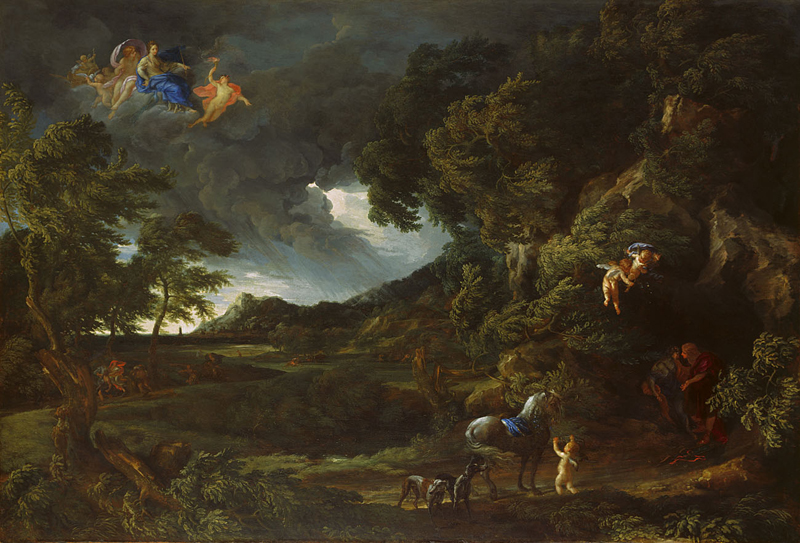
Carlo Maratta and Gaspard Dughet, Landscape with Dido and Aeneas, London, National Gallery

It would seem, however, that this work was preceded by a considerable output. On the basis of drawings in the Academia de San Fernando in Madrid and a drawing in the Kunsthalle Düsseldorf, a group of works have been assigned to the period immediately before and contemporaneous with the altarpiece of San Giuseppe dei Falegnami. These drawings include studies both for this altarpiece and for other works: the figures in Gaspard Dughet’s Landscape with Dido and Aeneas (London, National Gallery), the Virgin with Saints in the parish church of Camerano, the Preaching of St. John the Baptist (Musée des Beaux-Arts de Pau) and the Sacrifice of Noah. Maratta’s collaboration with Dughet suggests his rising popularity with a circle of distinguished private collectors.

The Adoration of the Shepherds marked his début in the public domain and the start of an uninterrupted flow of official commissions. The 1650s were decisive for his development. The influence of Sacchi remained, both in the classical rhythms of his compositions and in his Venetian painterliness; but he also explored other sources. The colour and chiaroscuro, best displayed in St. Rosalía among the Plague Sufferers (before 1660; Florence, Galleria Corsini), suggest the work of Giovanni Lanfranco, while the delicacy of the figures is indebted to Guido Reni. Pietro da Cortona became an invigorating influence, especially after 1656, when both artists worked for Pope Alexander VII on the decoration of the gallery of the Quirinal Palace.

In spite of remaining connected to the workshop of Sacchi, Maratta acted independently, and the works from these years display characteristics that make them original and individual. His style, less revolutionary than that of his young contemporaries, such as Pier Francesco Mola or Giovanni Battista Gaulli, perfectly fulfilled the requirements of the high dignitaries of the Roman Church for an official art that continued the classical tradition and was both grandiloquent and decorative. The most important of Maratta’s works from the early 1650s is the Peace of Augustus (Palais des Beaux-Arts de Lille), commissioned by Louis Phélypeaux, Seigneur of La Vrillière, for the upper gallery of the Hôtel de la Vrillière, Paris. In this picture Maratta was in competition with the most distinguished artists working in Rome: Guido Reni, Guercino, Nicolas Poussin, Alessandro Turchi and Pietro da Cortona, all of whom had contributed heroic subjects from ancient history to La Vrillière’s gallery. The picture suggests Maratta’s deep knowledge of the Classical world; both the dress and decorative detail reveal his knowledge of Roman sculpture, and the frieze-like composition and some of the figures appear to have been inspired by the reliefs of Augustus’ Ara Pacis.

Between 1651 and 1656 Maratta decorated the Cappella Alaleona in Sant'Isidoro a Capo le Case, Rome; for this he painted three altarpieces – the Marriage of the Virgin, the Death of St. Joseph and the Flight into Egypt – as well as the frescoed lunettes, of St. Joseph’s Dream and the Adoration of the Shepherds, and the fresco in the cupola of St. Joseph in Glory. Here he moved towards a more Baroque composition, with figures in movement, and strong contrasts of light and shadow. From the same period are the frescoed figures of Prudence and Innocence and the altarpiece of the Adoration of the Magi (all Rome, San Marco), commissioned by Nicolò Sagredo, the Venetian ambassador in Rome. The altarpiece suggests the influence of Guido Reni and, in the figure of the Virgin, of François Duquesnoy’s St. Susanna (Santa Maria di Loreto, Rome). In the St. Augustine in Santa Maria dei Sette Dolori, Rome, the artist used glowing, Venetian-inspired colour.

Pope Alexander VII commissioned many works from Maratta, notable among which is the Visitation (1656) for the church of Santa Maria della Pace, Rome. This is an accomplished composition, with many figures in movement, ideal beauty and elegant gesture; the ample clothing envelops the figures in a mass of folds set off by the light and demonstrates the influence of Gian Lorenzo Bernini. Maratta also contributed a fresco, the Adoration of the Shepherds, to the decoration of the Quirinal Palace, which was directed by Pietro da Cortona; here, for the first time, he used the light colours that were to characterize his later work. The commissions of the later 1650s, such as the Submission of Victor IV to Innocent II (Rome, Santa Croce in Gerusalemme) and Summer (Ariccia, Palazzo Chigi), with fruit and flowers painted by Mario Nuzzi, demonstrate his brilliant synthesis of the light and movement of the Roman Baroque with the ideal beauty of antique art.

=== Mature years, 1662–c. 1680 ===
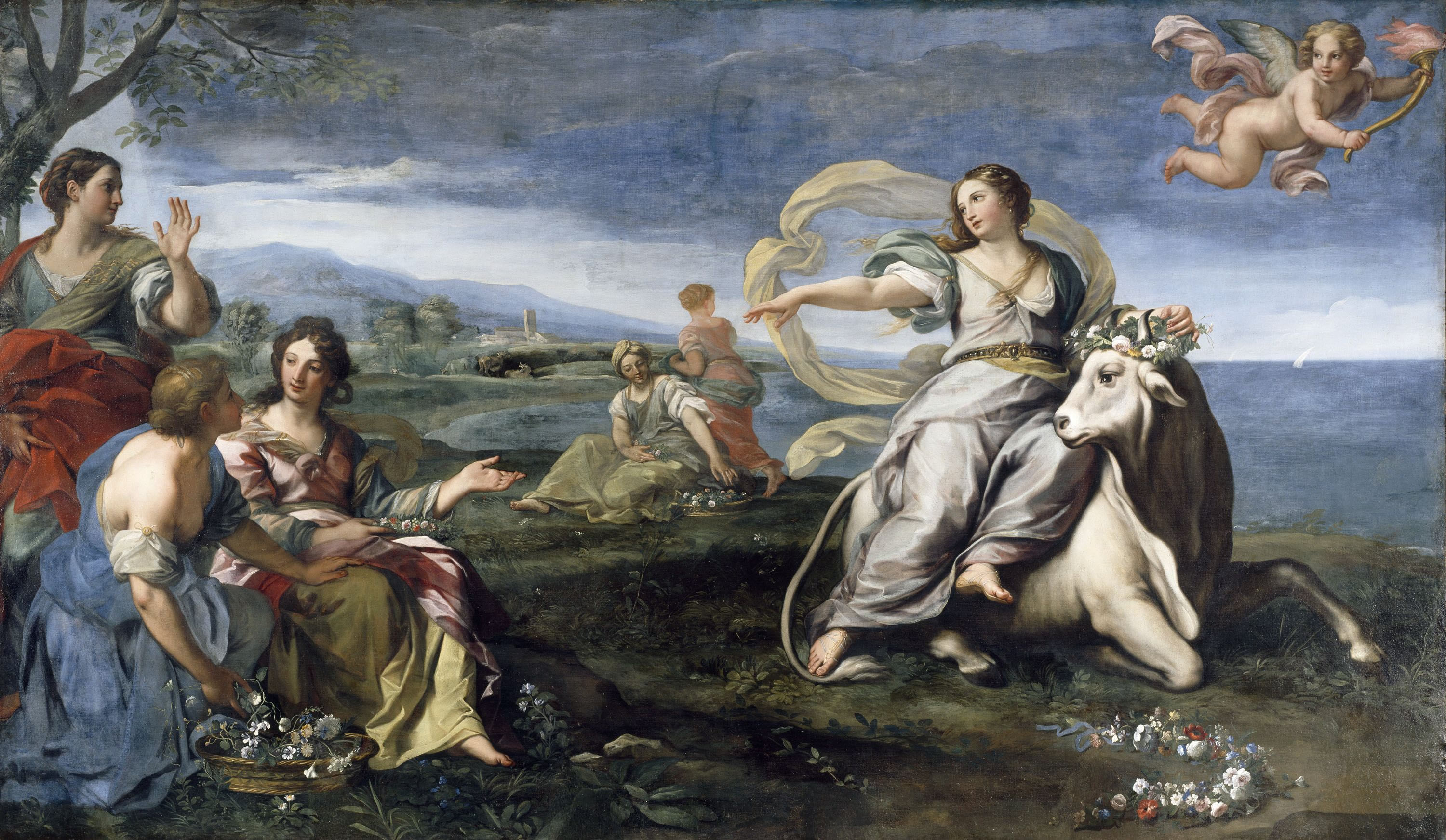
Rape of Europe (c. 1682), National Gallery of Ireland, Dublin

From 1660, he built a private client base of wealthy patrons throughout Europe. His workshop became the most prominent art studio in Rome of his time and, after the death of Bernini in 1680, he became the leading artist in Rome. In the early 1660s he worked on the decoration of the Cappella de’ Sylva in the Roman church of Sant'Isidoro, a project directed by Bernini; Maratti contributed the oval canvas of the Immaculate Conception over the main altar. This picture shows the Virgin with the Christ Child in her arms, helping her to kill the serpent of heresy; it became widely known through copies and engravings, and its iconography was immensely influential.

In the same period Maratta continued a series of Apostles for the Palazzo Barberini, which had been commissioned from Sacchi by Cardinal Antonio Barberini. The project, completed with the St. Matthew in the late 1690s, constitutes a direct precedent to the sculpted Apostles (Rome, Saint John Lateran) that he designed later. Maratta’s activity in cities outside Rome began in the same decade; he painted two altarpieces, the Visitation and the Flight into Egypt, for the Chigi Chapel in Siena Cathedral, where he again collaborated with Bernini. The Immaculate Virgin with Saints for the Sienese church of Sant'Agostino dates from c. 1665.

In 1664, Maratta became the director of the Accademia di San Luca and, concerned with elevating the status of artists, promoted the study and drawing of the art of Classical Antiquity. In 1672 Maratta travelled to Loreto to restore works by Annibale Carracci, Federico Barocci and Lorenzo Lotto, and in that year executed the Virgin with Saints for the altar in the Altieri Chapel of the Roman church of Santa Maria sopra Minerva. In both style and iconography this work is seminal to Maratta’s conception of the altarpiece; it is a balanced and harmonious composition, in which classical and monumental forms are enhanced by the clear light and rich, pure colours. Despite their idealization, each of the figures remains individual.

In 1674 Maratta was commissioned by Pope Clement X to fresco the ceiling of the salone in the Palazzo Altieri. The iconographic programme for The Triumph of Clemency (dated 1674) in this Roman palace was devised by Bellori. The fresco represents an allegorical glorification of pope Clement X Altieri and his nephews, which in a play on his name celebrates a central personification of Clementia, the Roman goddess of mercy. Around her twines an allegorical composition that immortalizes the pope's happy and peaceful reign. Unlike the nave fresco in the nearby Church of the Gesù which Giovan Battista Gaulli was painting at the same time, Maratta did not employ illusionistic effects. His scene remained within its frame and used few figures in line with the principles of sparsity of figures championed by Sacchi.

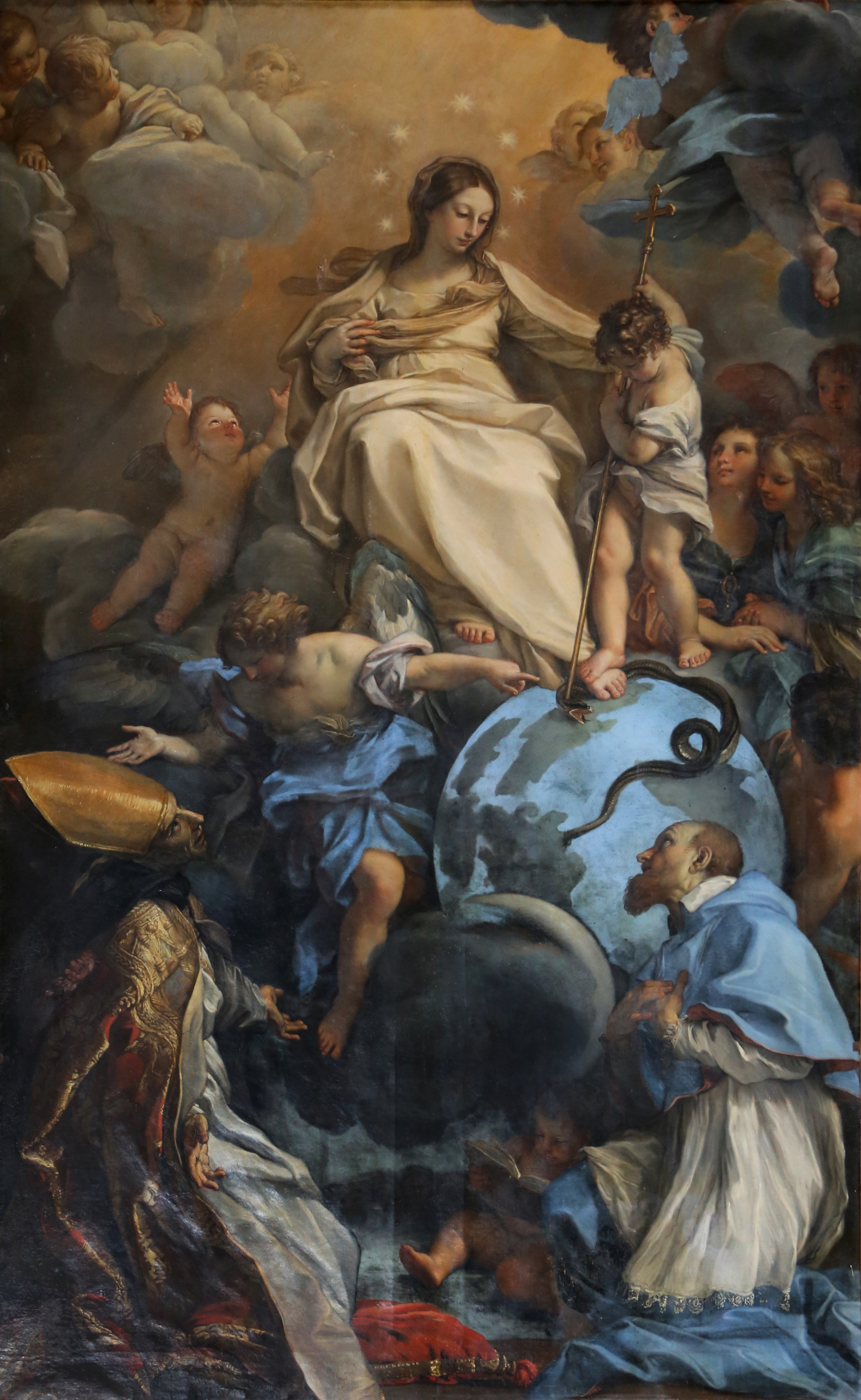
Virgin in Glory with Saints Francis de Sales and Thomas of Villanova (between 1665 and 1671)

In 1676 Maratta painted the Death of St. Joseph for the chapel of Empress Eleonore Magdalene of Neuburg as well as the Martyrdom of St. Blaise and St. Sebastian (Genoa, San Biagio) for the Roman church of San Carlo ai Catinari. His major works of this period include: The Appearance of the Virgin to St. Philip Neri (c. 1675) now in the Pitti Palace in Florence, The Virgin with Saints Carlo Borromeo and Ignatius of Loyola, and Angels (c. 1685) for the church of Santa Maria in Vallicella (c. 1675) and The Assumption of the Virgin with Doctors of the Church (1686) for the Cybo Chapel in Santa Maria del Popolo. The latter is a measured and, to a certain degree, cold composition, but it presents its subject forcefully and is a clear precedent of 18th-century Neoclassicism. It was not, as his critics claimed, numerous depictions of the Virgin that earned him the nickname Carluccio delle Madonne or ‘Little Carlo of the Madonnas', but his gifted interpretation of this theme. Other works included an altarpiece, The Death of St Francis Xavier (1674–79) in the San Francesco Xavier Chapel in the right transept of the Church of the Gesù.

His work of the 1670s culminated in the series of the Four Seasons (untraced), commissioned by Cardinal Luis Manuel Fernández de Portocarrero for the king of Spain, Charles II, and known through engravings and the preparatory drawings, and in work on the Apollo and Daphne (1681; Brussels, Royal Museums of Fine Arts of Belgium), executed for Louis XIV. This was one of the most celebrated works of the time, to which Bellori dedicated a eulogistic pamphlet, and which earned the painter the title of Royal Painter to the French Court.

Maratta was a well-known portrait painter. He painted Sacchi (c. 1655, Prado), Cardinal Antonio Barberini (c. 1660 Palazzo Barberini), Pope Clement IX (1669, Vatican Pinacoteca) and various self-portraits (Uffizi, Florence (1682) and Royal Museums of Fine Arts of Belgium, Brussels (c. 1695)). He also painted numerous English sitters during their visits to Rome on the Grand Tour, having sketched antiquities for John Evelyn as early as 1645.

In 1679 or 1680, his mistress, Francesca Gommi (or Gomma) gave birth to their daughter Faustina. He legally recognized her as his daughter in 1698 and upon becoming a widower in 1700, Maratta married the girl's mother. His daughter's features were incorporated into a number of Maratta's late paintings. She later married the poet Giambattista Felice Zappi and became a prominent poet and member of the Academy of Arcadia In 1704, Maratta was knighted by Pope Clement XI.

=== Later years ===
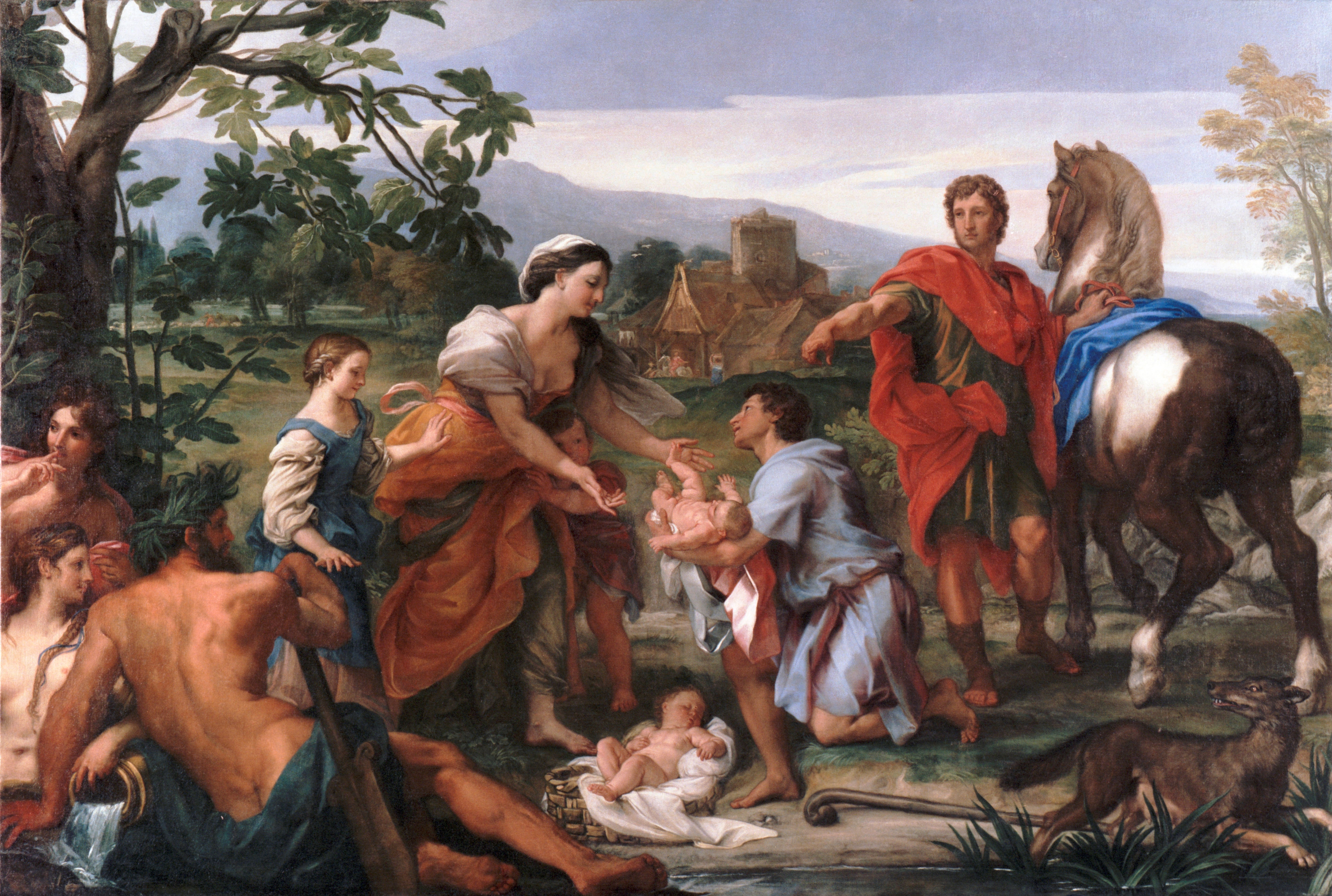
The finding of Romulus and Remus, Sanssouci Picture Gallery, Potsdam

With a general decline in patronage around the beginning of the eighteenth century, largely due to the economic downturn, Maratta turned his hand to the restoration of paintings, including works by Raphael and Carracci. In 1702 Maratta was appointed Director of the Antiquities of Rome, and Pope Clement XI commissioned him to restore the frescoes in the Raphael Rooms. In 1700 he was again elected director of the Accademia di San Luca, a responsibility that was renewed in perpetuity in 1706, an unprecedented honour.

Few works have been preserved from this period. Illness may have caused his output to diminish, and many works remain untraced. For such patrons as Cardinal Paolo Savelli, Prince Livio Odescalchi, Ferrante Capponi or the Marchese Nicolò Maria Pallavicini, Maratta executed mythological works, such as the Rape of Europa (Dublin, National Gallery of Ireland) and Venus, Ceres and Bacchus, known through drawings, as well as private devotional works. Distinguished by its ravishing colour is the Madonna of the Rosary (1695) for the Oratorio del Rosario di Santa Cita, Palermo. His designs of sculptures included figures of the Apostles for San Giovanni in Laterano (1701). In 2024, an electrician working in the Villa Farnesina in Rome discovered previously unknown frescoes by Maratta that can be dated back to the late 17th century. The forgotten works were in pristine condition and had been hidden for nearly two centuries.

The Apparition of the Virgin to St. Andrea Corsini for the chapel of the Palazzo Corsini in Florence, the Virgin with Saints (1700–09) for the church of San Filippo Neri, Turin, commissioned by Emmanuel Philibert, Prince of Carignano, and the Baptism (1710) for the Certosa di San Martino in Naples are Maratta’s last works. Maratta continued to run his studio into old age even when he could no longer paint. He died in 1713 in Rome, and was buried there in Santa Maria degli Angeli. On his death, at the age of 88, Maratta received exceptional honours: his coffin was carried by members of the Accademia di San Luca and his funeral and burial were attended by all the members of the Accademia and of the Virtuosi al Pantheon. Maratta had many pupils, making him one of the strongest influences in Italian art of the early 18th century.

=== Portraits ===
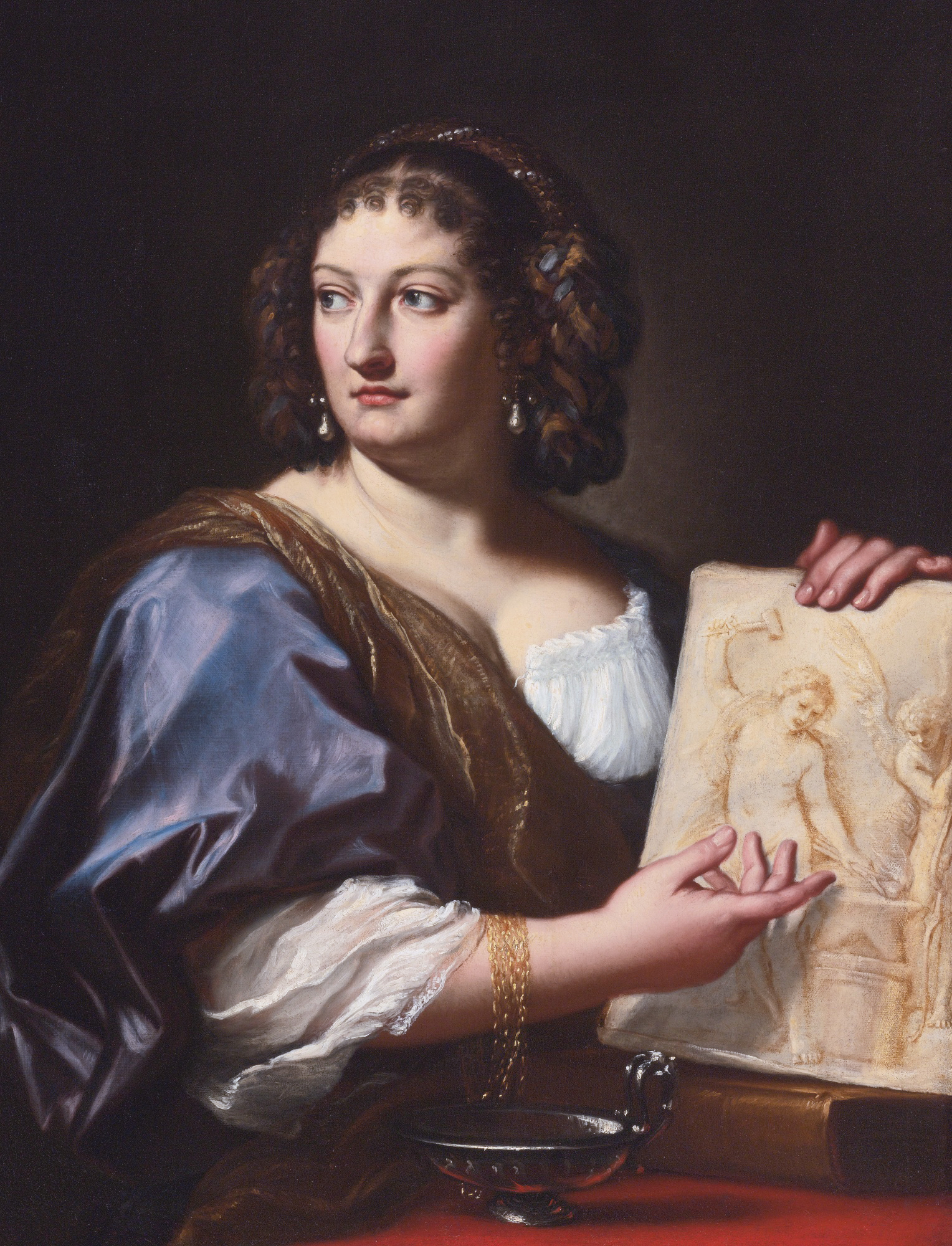
Portrait of Francesca Gommi Maratta, c. 1690, Cleveland Museum of Art

Maratta was a distinguished portrait painter, whose blend of realism and an idealizing elegance ensured his immediate success. Such portraits as Andrea Sacchi (c. 1655; Madrid, Museo del Prado) are characterized by simplicity of composition and intense concentration, but he gradually developed a more decorative Baroque style, indebted to Anthony van Dyck or Philippe de Champaigne, as in the portrait of Cardinal Antonio Barberini (c. 1660; Rome, Palazzo Barberini).

The splendour of the draperies in such works and the rich and brilliant colour are combined with allegorical or mythological elements or themes derived from ancient history, as in the portrait of Robert Spencer (c. 1661) and the portrait of Wentworth Dillon (c. 1665; both Althorp House, West Northamptonshire). His portraits have something in common with contemporary French portraiture, on which he may have had some influence. His Pope Clement IX (1669; Rome, Pinacoteca Vaticana) unites realism and psychological depth with rich draperies and an evocation of wisdom and dignity; it echoes Renaissance portraits by Titian and Raphael, as well as Velázquez’s Pope Innocent X (1650–51; Rome, Galleria Doria Pamphilj;.

In the 1670s Maratti executed a notable series of portraits, such as those of Thomas Isham (c. 1677; Lamport Hall, Northamptonshire) and Charles Fox (c. 1679; Earl of Ilchester priv. col.); others remain untraced, such as those of Charles Errard and Michel-Ange de La Chausse, known through drawings and engravings, or that of Giovanni Pietro Bellori (Rome, priv. col.). These are all more idealizing works and incorporate references to the sitter’s occupation (Bellori, for example, is seated in front of books written by himself); the more ample draperies add to the decorative aspect of these pictures. His Self-portrait (after 1695; Brussels, Oldmasters Museum) is an outstanding act of self-glorification, showing the artist, rejuvenated, idealized and ennobled, against a landscape background; a female figure personifying Painting is shown inscribing his name on Minerva’s shield.

In Cleopatra Dissolving the Pearl (c. 1692; Rome, Museo nazionale del Palazzo di Venezia) the artist painted his daughter Faustina as Cleopatra; and in the Marchese Nicolò Maria Pallavicini with the Artist (1706; Stourhead, Wiltshire), one of the most ostentatious portraits of the Roman Baroque, Maratti appears seated on the right accompanied by the Charites and painting the heroically clad Marchese, whom Glory crowns with laurel and to whom Genius (based on the Apollo Belvedere, Rome, Vatican, Museo Pio-Clementino) indicates the Temple of Virtue in the background.

=== Designs for sculpture and architecture ===
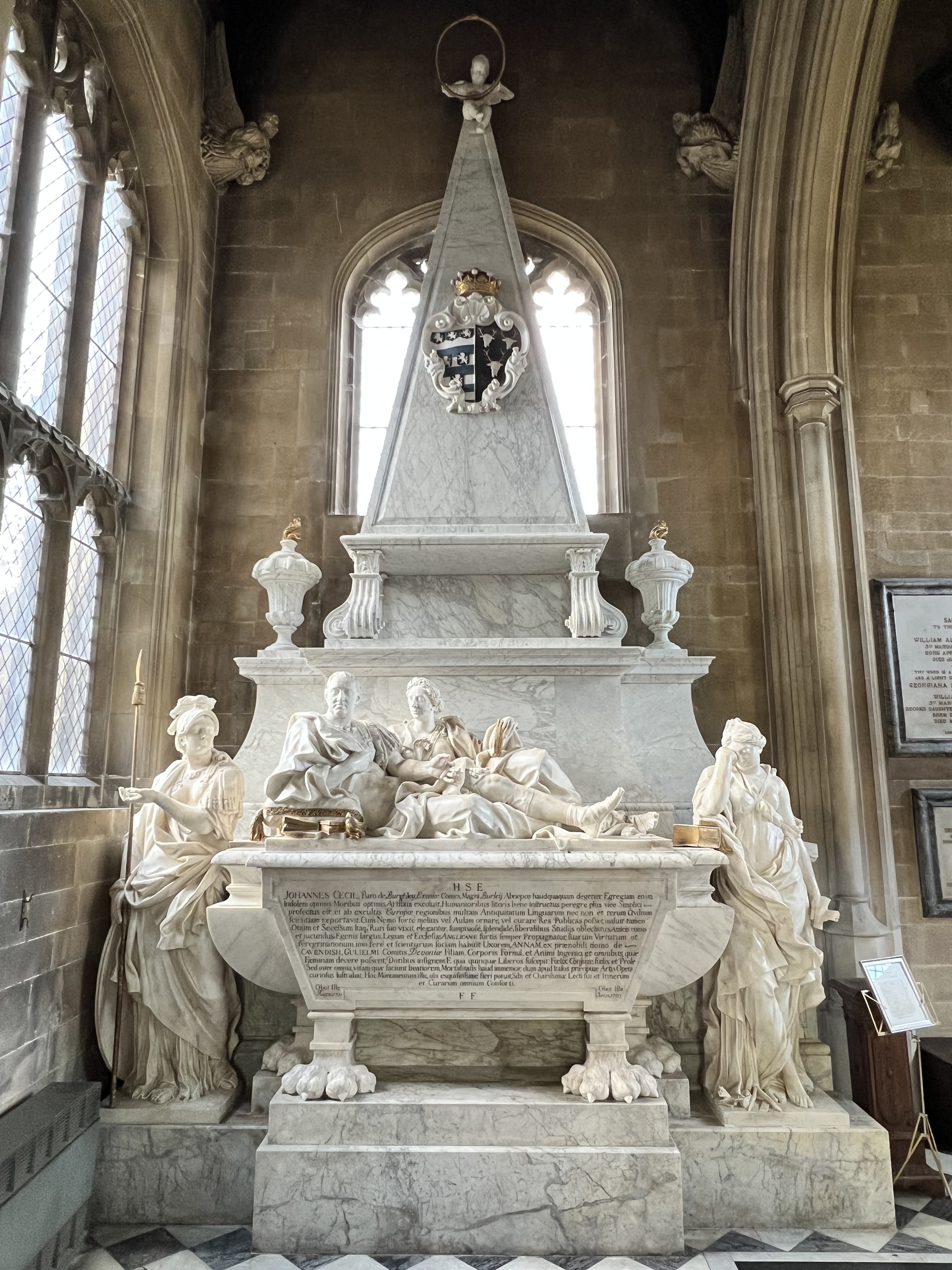
Tomb of John Cecil, 5th Earl of Exeter, St. Martin, Stamford, Lincolnshire

On the death of Pope Innocent XI in 1689, his nephew Livio Odescalchi commissioned Maratta to design the Pope’s tomb (1701; Rome, St Peter’s); it was executed by the French sculptor Pierre-Étienne Monnot. Maratta’s activity as a director or designer of sculptural decorations was concentrated in the period 1689 to 1713, although it was by no means a new activity – years before he had presented drawings for the monument to Raphael in the Pantheon.

In the Royal Academy of Fine Arts of San Fernando in Madrid there are various studies by him for an entrance to a chapel, an organ loft and a series of funerary and fountain monuments. He also collaborated with Monnot on the tomb of John Cecil, 5th Earl of Exeter (erected 1704) for the church of St. Martin in Stamford, Lincolnshire, and c. 1695 he made preparatory drawings for his own funerary monument (completed in 1704; Rome, Santa Maria degli Angeli), which was executed by the sculptor Francesco Moratti.

He was also involved in a series of sculptures of Apostles for San Giovanni in Laterano, Rome, commissioned in 1701; numerous preparatory drawings of St. John, St. Matthew and St. Peter survive for these works, which were executed by Monnot and Camillo Rusconi, among others, and finished after Maratta’s death. Maratta’s sculptural style is closer to that of Bernini than to the more rigorous classical style of younger sculptors. Nevertheless, the elegant and rhetorical attitudes of the Apostles are derived from the grandiose figures in Maratta’s altarpieces.

== Selected works ==
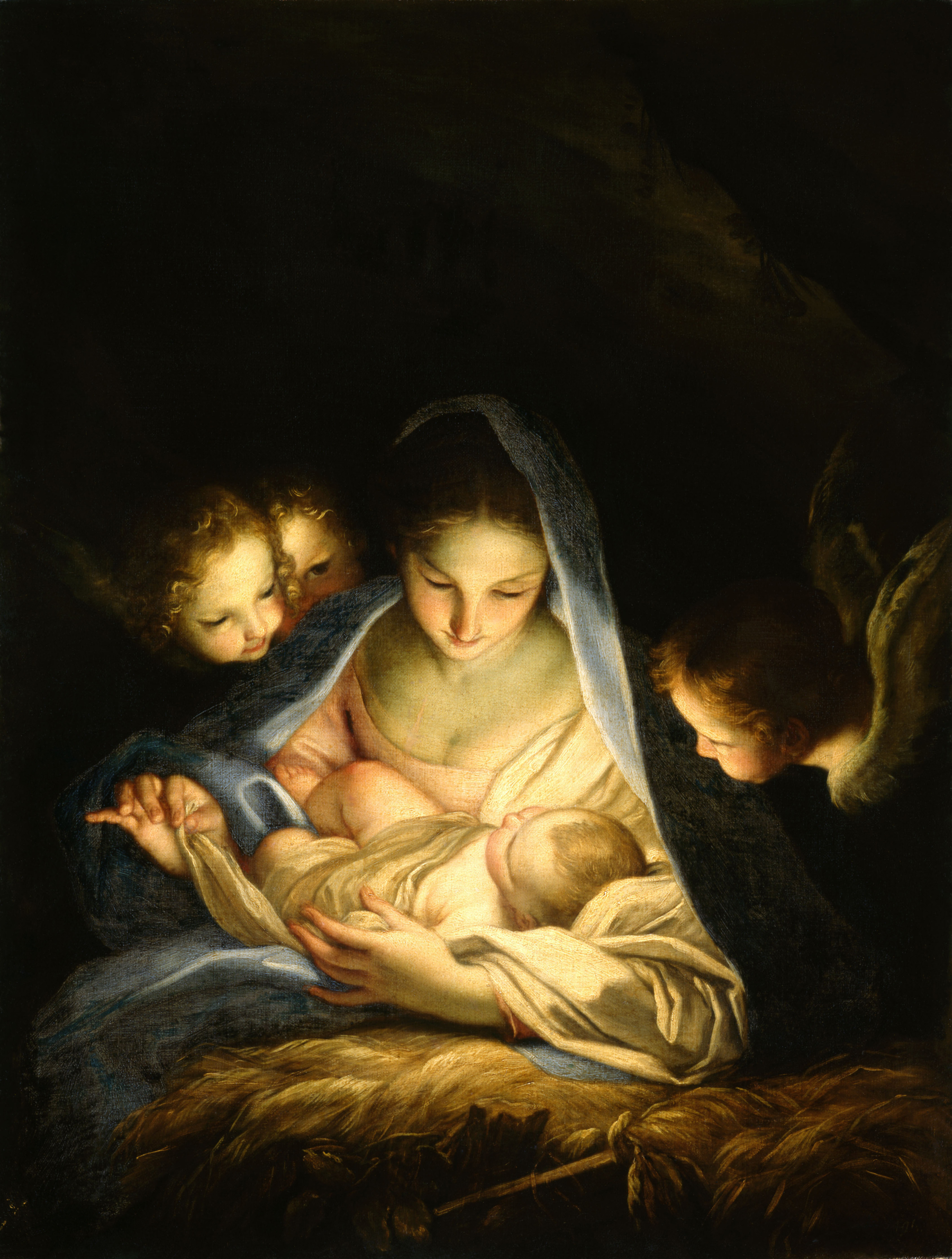
The Holy Night, 1655, Staatliche Kunstsammlungen Dresden

- Birth of the Virgin, 1643–1645, Church of Saint Clare, Nocera Umbra.
- The Holy Night, 1655, Staatliche Kunstsammlungen Dresden
- Juno Beseeching Aeolus to Release the Winds Against the Trojan Fleet, 1654–1656, Ackland Art Museum, University of North Carolina at Chapel Hill.
- The Emperor Augustus Closes the Doors of the Temple of Janus, c. 1655–1657, Palais des Beaux-Arts de Lille.
- Rebecca and Eliezer at the Well, 1655–1657, Indianapolis Museum of Art.
- Madonna of the Rosary, 1655–57, Oratorio del Rosario di Santa Cita, Palermo
- The Triumph of Clemency, 1673–1675, Palazzo Altieri, Rome.
- The Virgin and Child in Glory, c. 1680, Spanish Royal Collection, National Museum, Madrid
- St John the Baptist Explaining the Doctrine of the Immaculate Conception to Sts Gregory, Augustine, and John Chrysostom, 1686, Cybo Chapel, Santa Maria del Popolo, Rome.
- Portrait of Clement IX Rospigliosi, 1669, Pinacoteca Gallery, Vatican Museums, Rome.
- Saint Joseph and the Infant Christ, Dunedin Public Art Gallery, Dunedin.
- Assumption of an Enthroned Virgin, Santa Maria in Vepretis, San Ginesio

== Gallery ==
=== Paintings ===
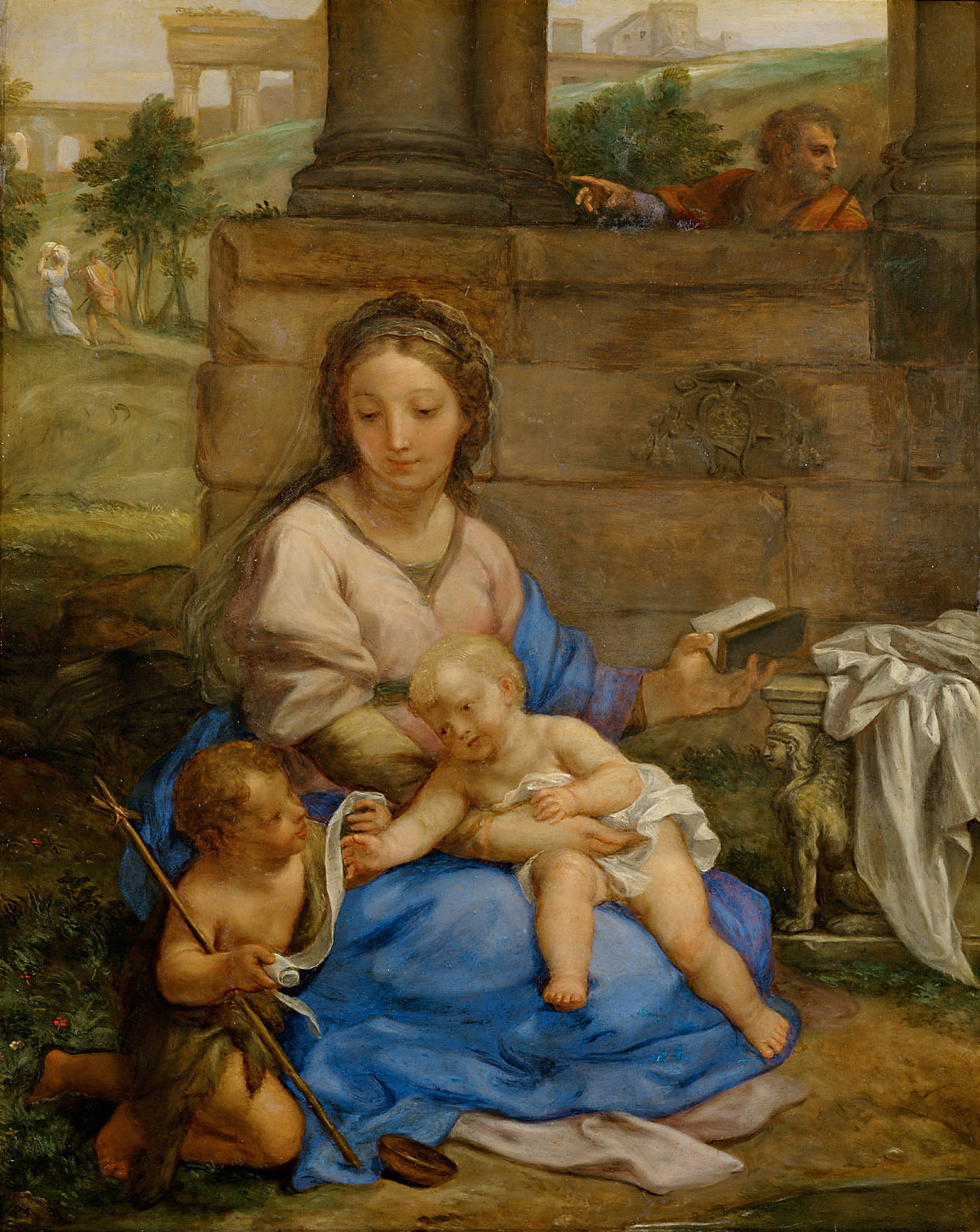
Nativity, c. 1650, Kunsthistorisches Museum, Vienna

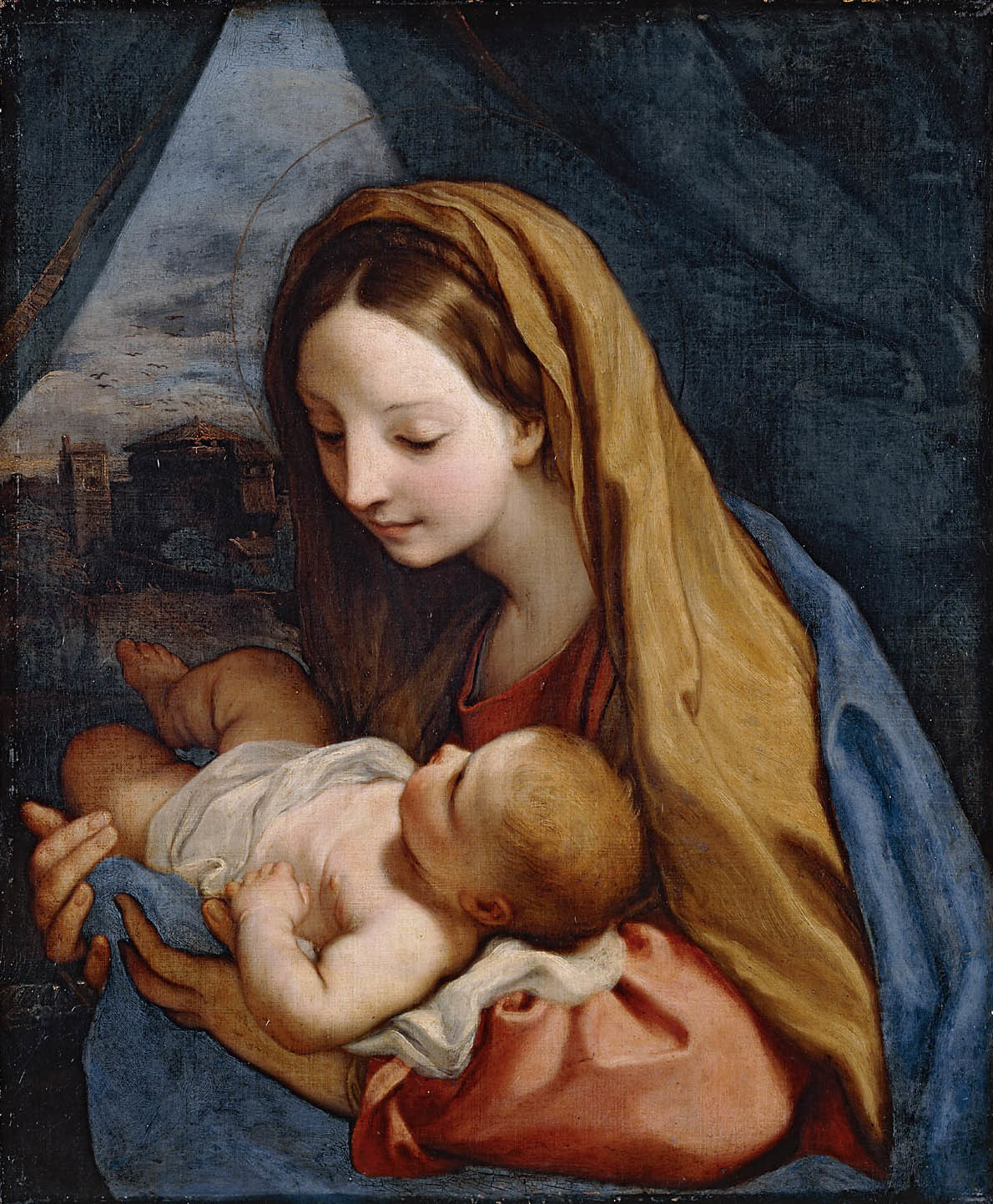
Madonna with Child, 1704, Kunsthistorisches Museum, Vienna

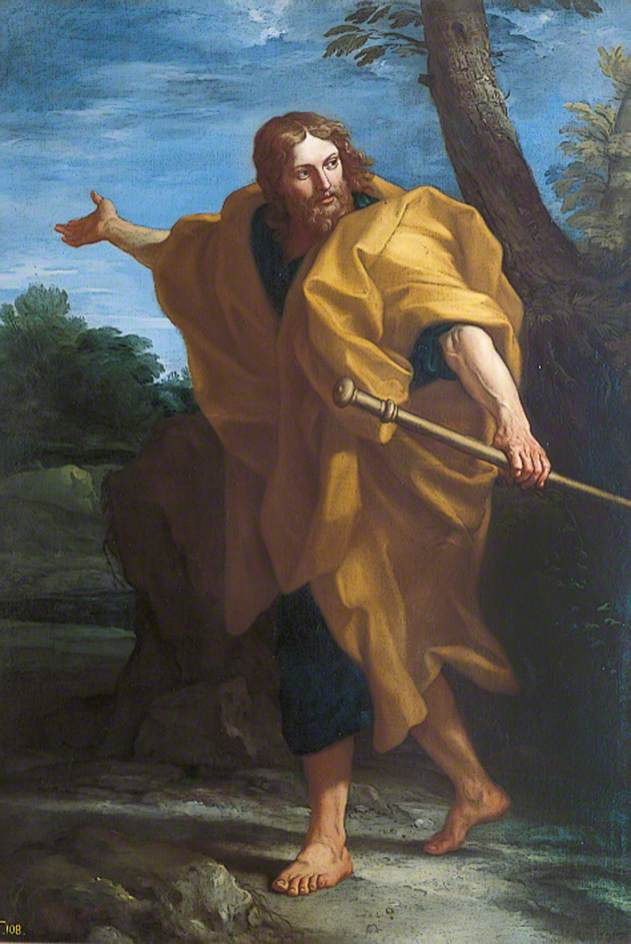
Saint James the Greater, c. 1661, Temple Newsam, Leeds

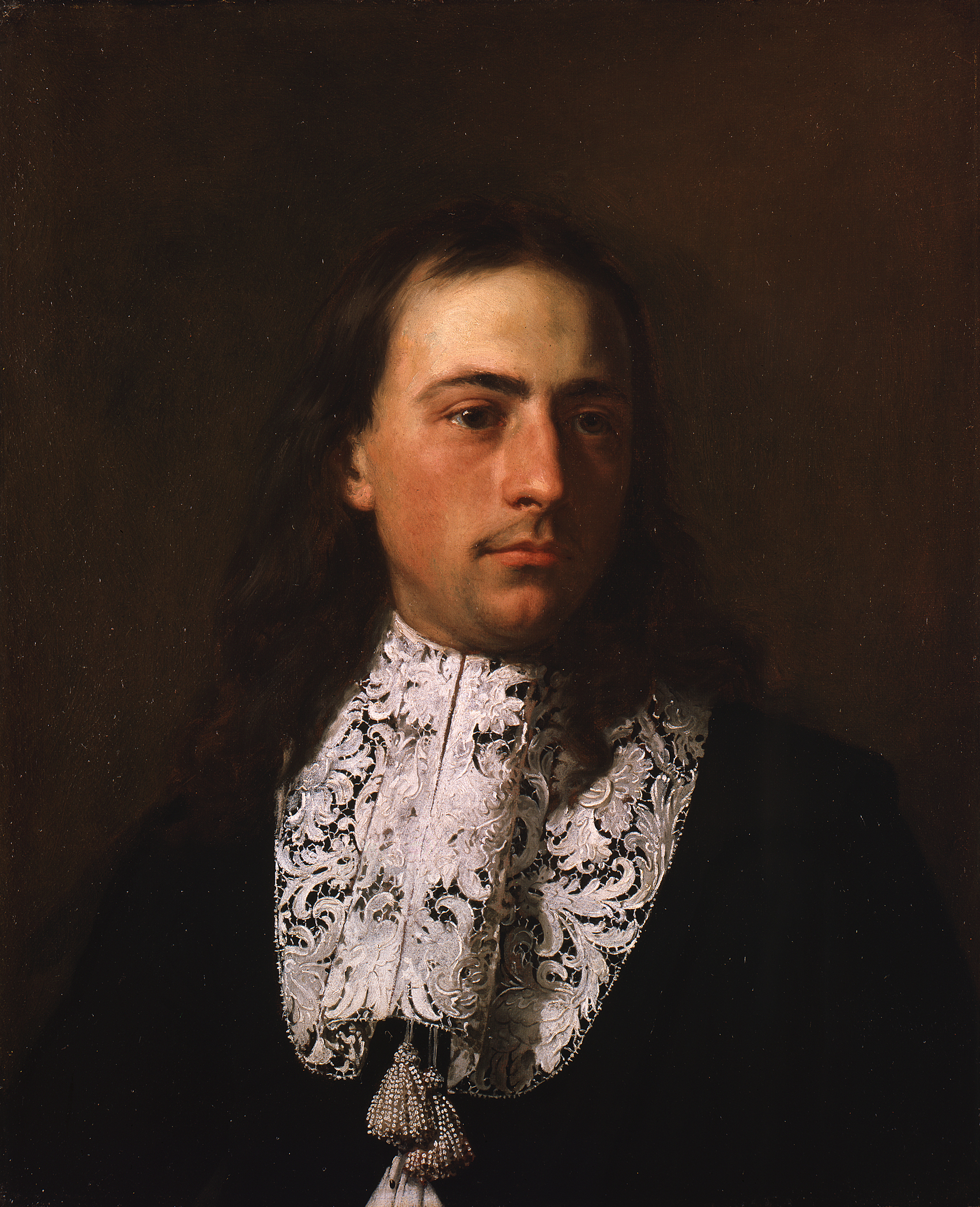
Portrait of a Young Man, 1663, Gemäldegalerie, Berlin

The Holy Family, c. 1685-1688, Toledo Museum of Art

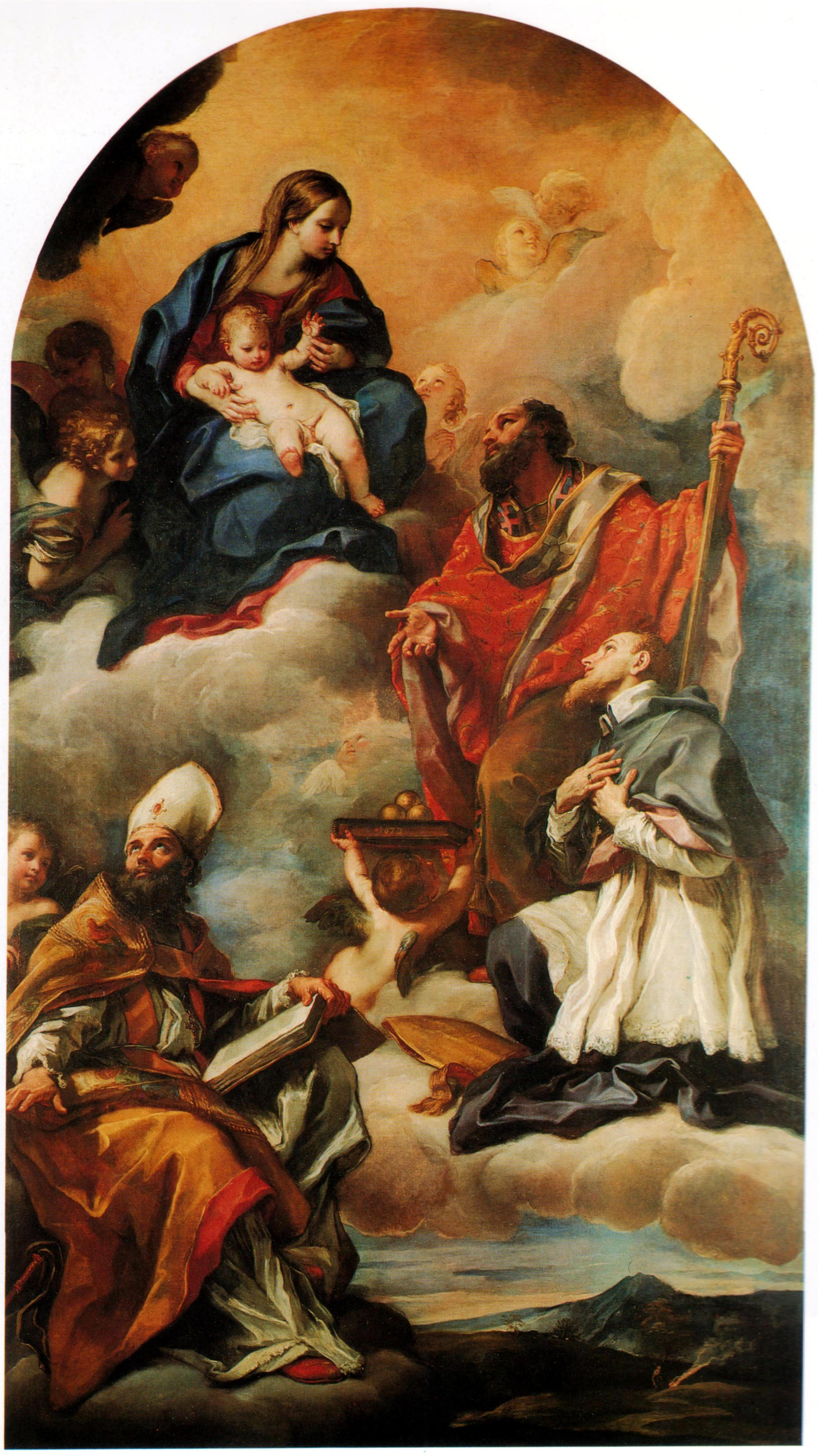
Virgin and Child with St. Ambrose, St. Francis de Sales and St. Nicholas, Pinacoteca civica Francesco Podesti, Ancona

The Flight into Egypt, c. 1664, Metropolitan Museum of Art, New York

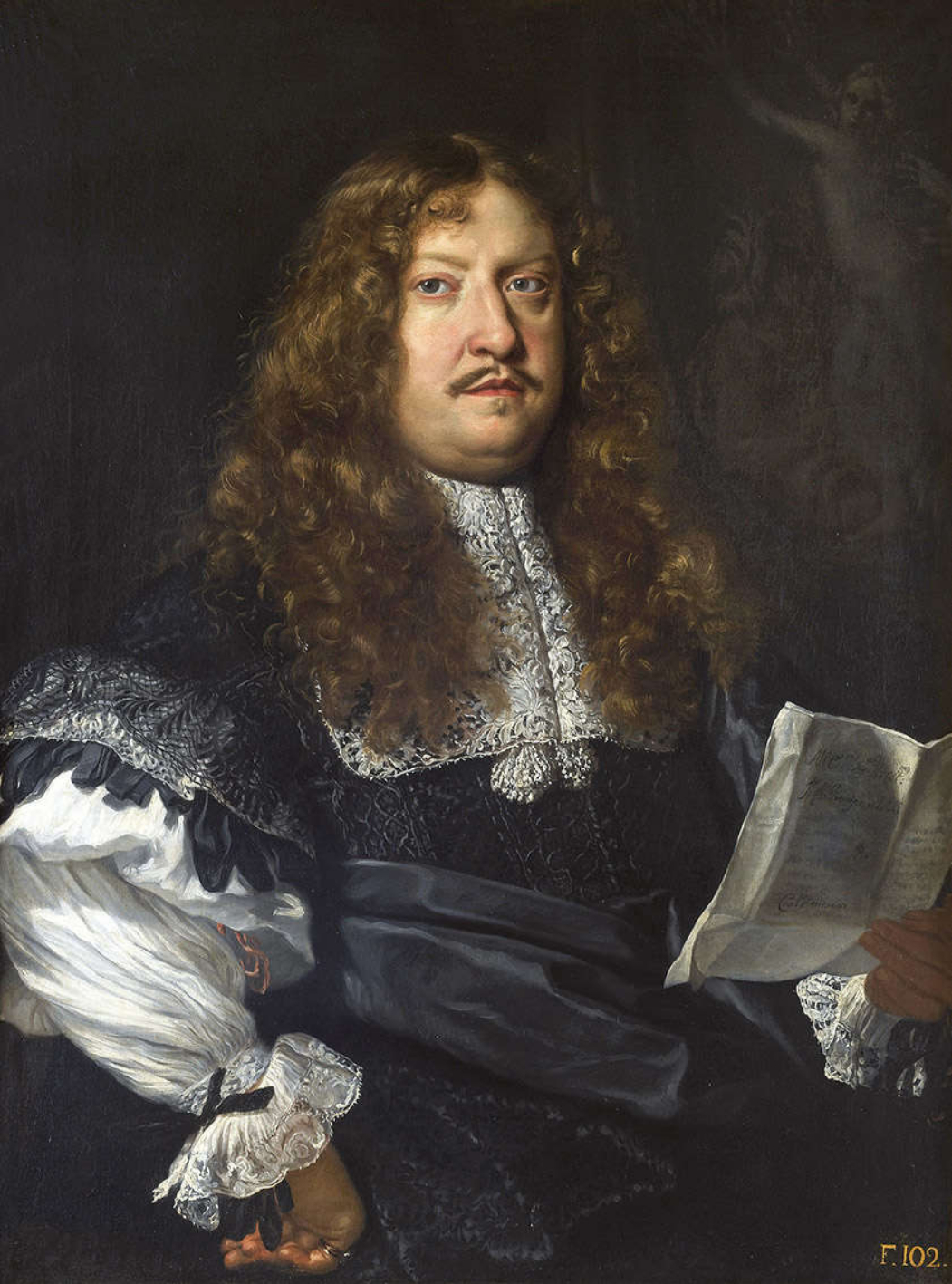
Portrait of Prince Maffeo Barberini, c. 1670, priv col.

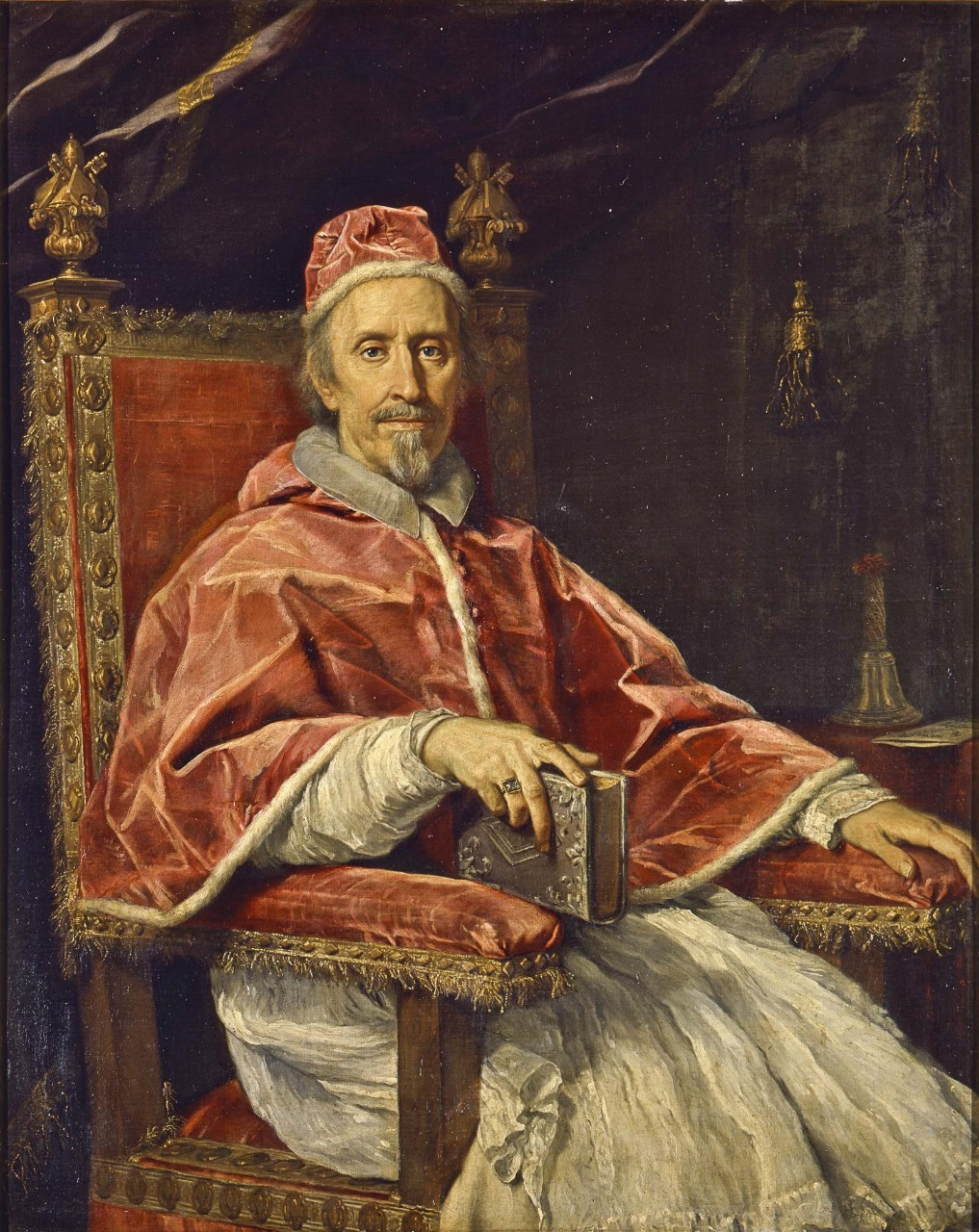
Portrait of Pope Clement IX, 1669, Pinacoteca Vaticana

=== Drawings ===
Portrait of Domenico Guidi, 1680, British Museum, London

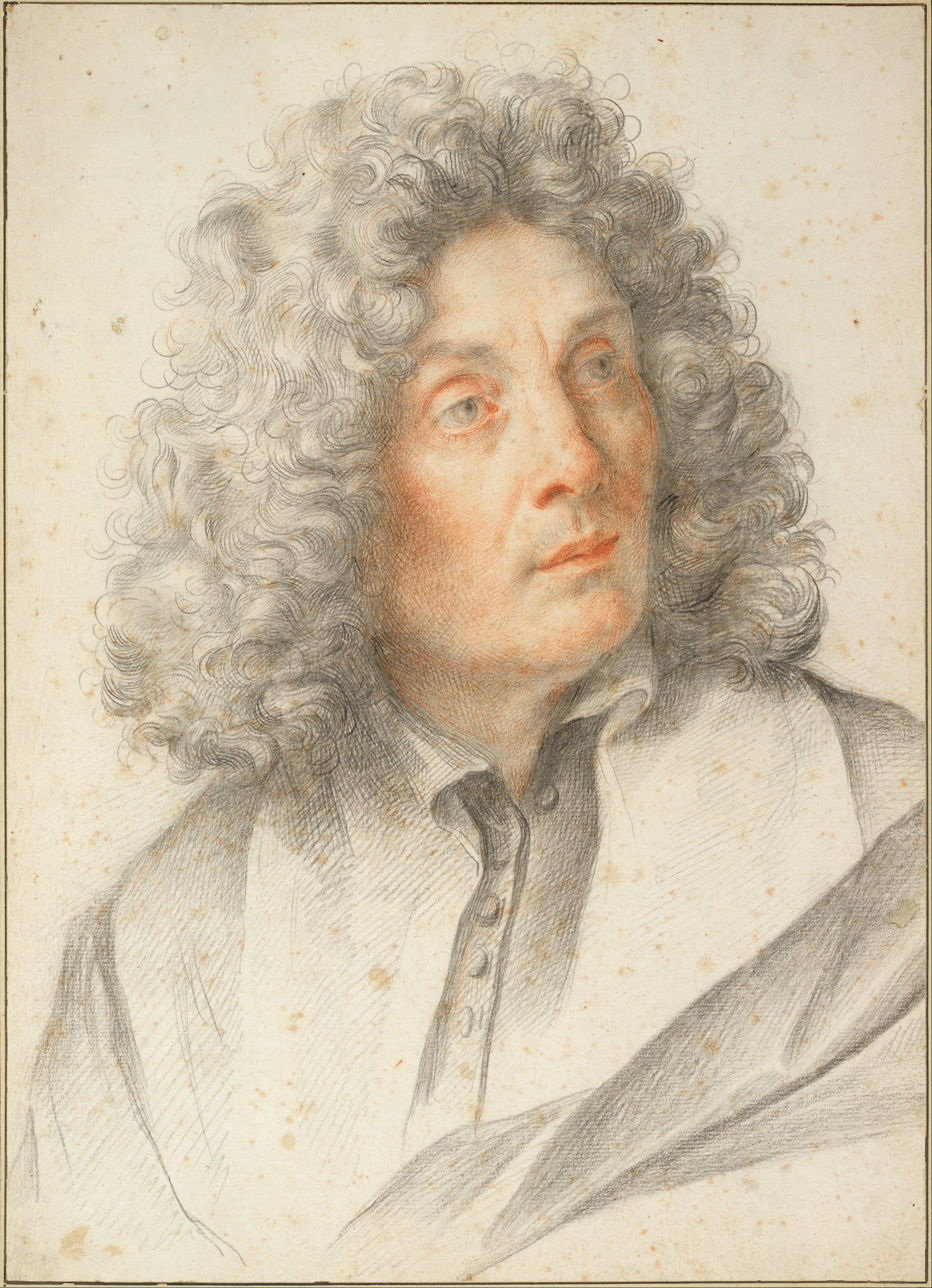
Self-Portrait, Albertina, Vienna

Head of a Young Boy, Metropolitan Museum of Art, New York

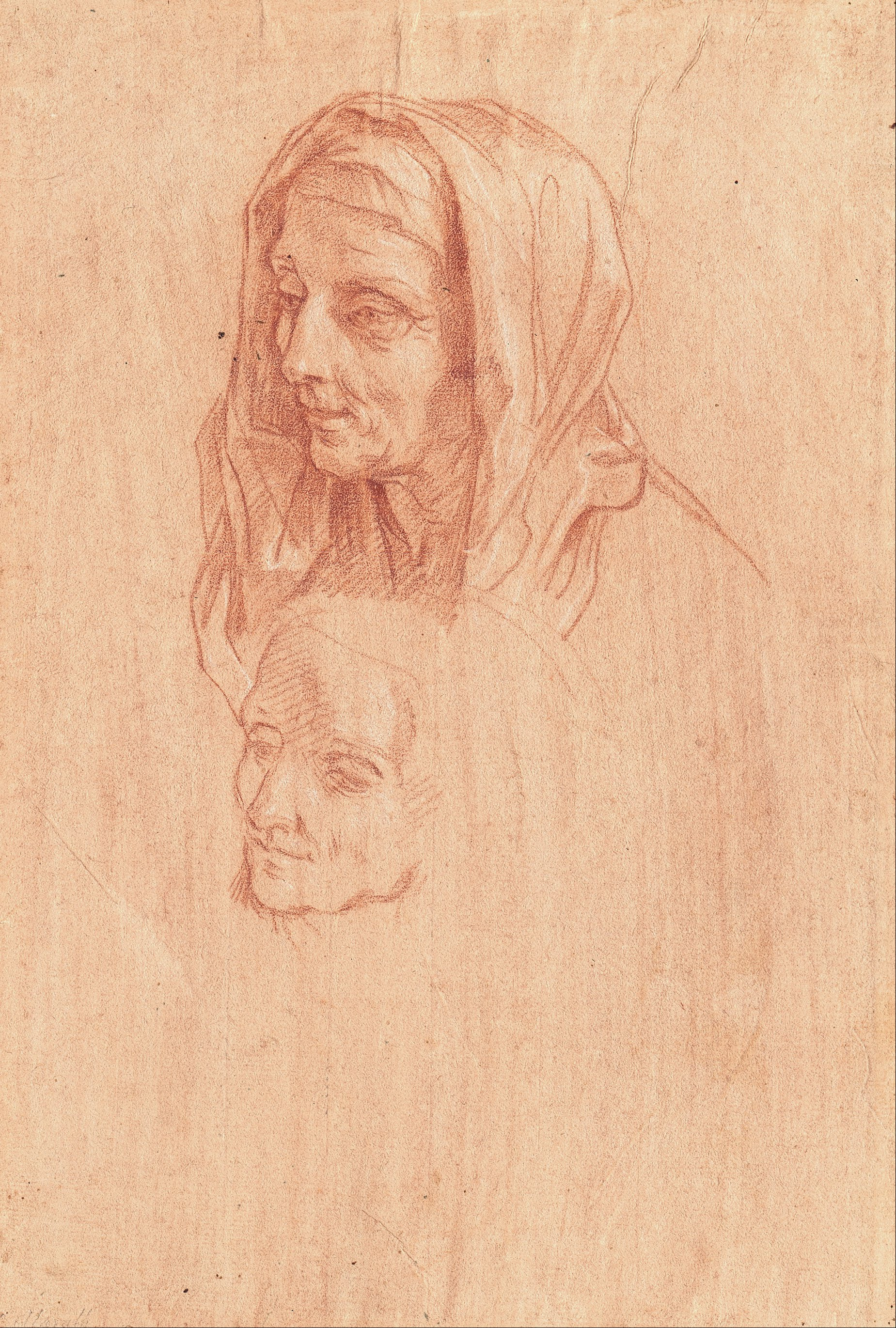
Pluto Bringing Proserpine to the Gates of Hell, 1685, Museum Kunstpalast, Düsseldorf

Portrait of Faustina Maratti, 1686, Royal Academy of Fine Arts of San Fernando, Madrid

Self-portrait, c. 1680-1685, Kupferstich-Kabinett, Dresden

== See also ==
- List of Carlo Maratta pupils and assistants
