= Faustina Maratti =

Italian poet and painter (c. 1679–1745)

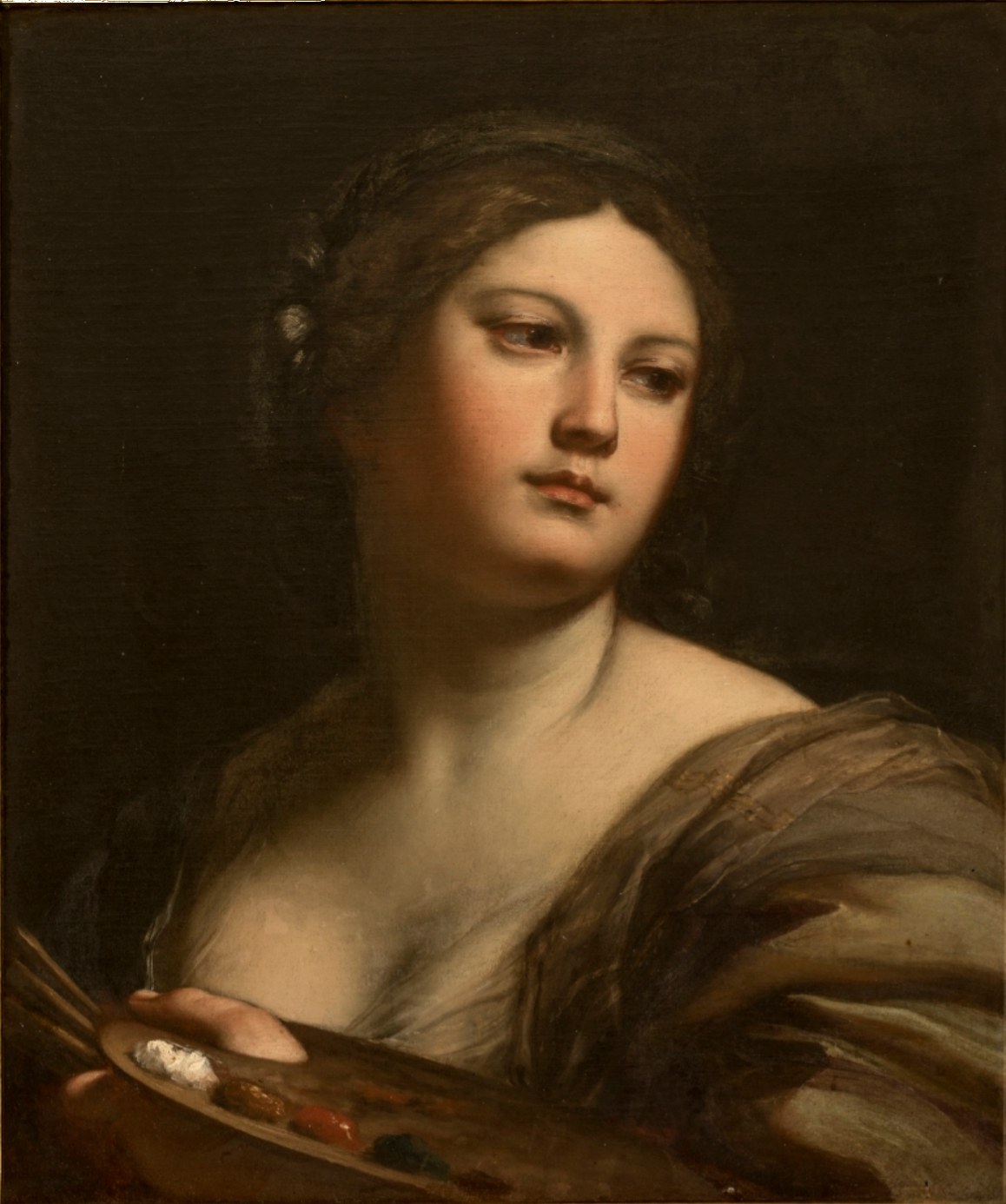
- Faustina Maratti, by Carlo Maratti 1698
- Born: c. 1679; Rome, Papal States
- Died: 1745 (aged 65–66); Rome, Papal States
- Known for: Painting, Poetry
- Movement: Baroque
- Spouse: Giambattista Felice Zappi

Faustina Maratti (c. 1679–1745) was an Italian Baroque poet and painter.

== Biography ==
Maratti was born in Rome, the natural daughter of the painter Carlo Maratta (or Maratti). From an early age, she received a good education, which included music, fine arts, and, above all, poetry. Her beauty attracted the attention of Giangiorgio Sforza Cesarini, a son of the Duke of Genzano, near Rome, where Maratta had retired. After her refusal, Sforza Cesarini tried to kidnap her as she walked to Mass with her mother and friends. He failed, but during the struggle she was wounded on the left temple, leaving a scar. Sforza Cesarini was sentenced to prison, escaped and fled to Spain.

In 1704, her heroic resistance gained her a place in the Arcadia Literary Academy, under the name of Aglauro Cidonia. Here she met the poet Giambattista Felice Zappi, a lawyer from Imola whom she married in 1705. Their house became a renowned literary circle: people attending included, among the others, Georg Friedrich Händel, Domenico Scarlatti, Giovanni Vincenzo Gravina and Giovanni Mario Crescimbeni. The two had two sons: Rinaldo in 1709 (who died two years later) and Luigi in 1712. She became a widow in 1719.

Her works include 38 sonnets published in her husband's collection Rime in 1723. They are in Petrarchesque style, according to the rules established by the poetry theorist Crescimbeni. Some of them are inspired by her father's works, while others pivot around female figures of the Roman Republic.

== Selected works ==
The Canzoniere by Maratti (or Aglauro Cidonia) includes only 38 sonnets which were published, together with the verses of her husband, for the first time in 1723 in the Rime collection, "by Giovanni Battista Felice Zappi and Faustina Maratti, his wife, added other poems by most famous of the Arcadia of Rome". These are Petrarchian-style sonnets, formally elegant and balanced according to the canons of the theorist Giovanni Mario Crescimbeni. The youth sonnets had as their subject great female figures of the Roman world (Veturia, Tuzia, Porzia, Lucrezia), and often drew inspiration from the paintings of his father Carlo Maratta. Much more felt are the rhymes of mature age that sing, with measured style, the family affections or the pain for the death of their son Rinaldo.

Some compositions that remained unpublished during Faustina's life are known: 5 sonnets and an epistoletta published in the fifteenth edition of the rhymes of the Zappi spouses; the epistoletta testifies that Maratti did not only write sonnets.

She died in 1745 in Rome and is buried in the church of San Carlo alle Quattro Fontane.
