= Giambattista Felice Zappi =

Italian poet

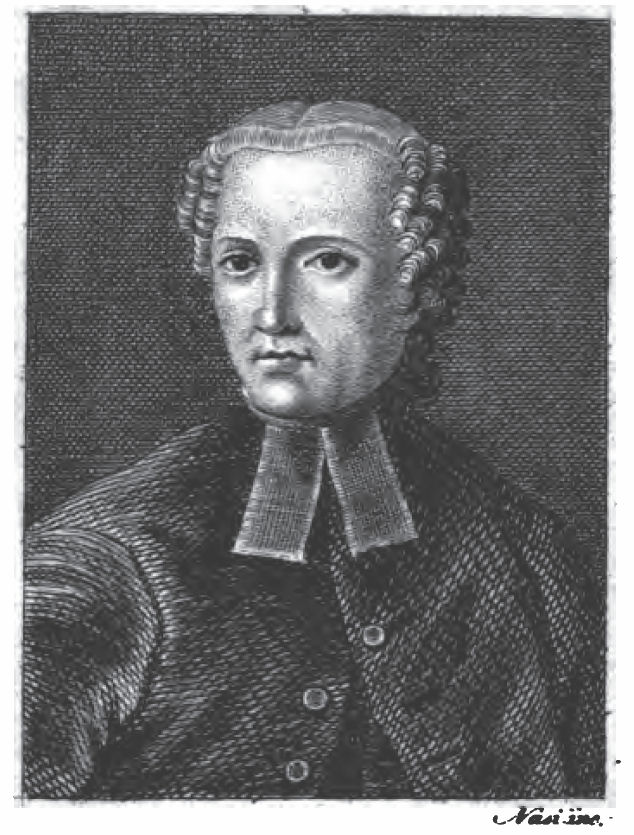
Giambattista Felice Zappi.

Giambattista Felice Zappi (1667 – 30 July 1719) was an Italian poet.

== Biography ==
A native of Imola, he studied there and then in Bologna, where he graduated at only 13 under Ulisse Giuseppe Gozzadini, bishop of Imola and later cardinal. In 1687 he moved to Rome, where he worked as lawyer. Pope Innocent XII gave him charges in the Agriculture and Roads Tribunals. Led by his passion for poetry, he entered the Accademia degli Infecondi and later the Accademia dell'Arcadia, of which he was one of the founders.

In 1705 he married Faustina Maratti, daughter of the painter Carlo Maratta, also a poet. Their house became home to a renowned literary circle. Zappi died in Rome in 1719 at the age of 52, most likely from malaria. He is buried, together with Carlo Maratta, in the basilica of Santa Maria degli Angeli in Rome.

His works include a collection of poems published in 1723, the Rime, including also some from his wife.
