= Émile Mellinet =

French general and senator (1798–1894)

Émile Henry Mellinet
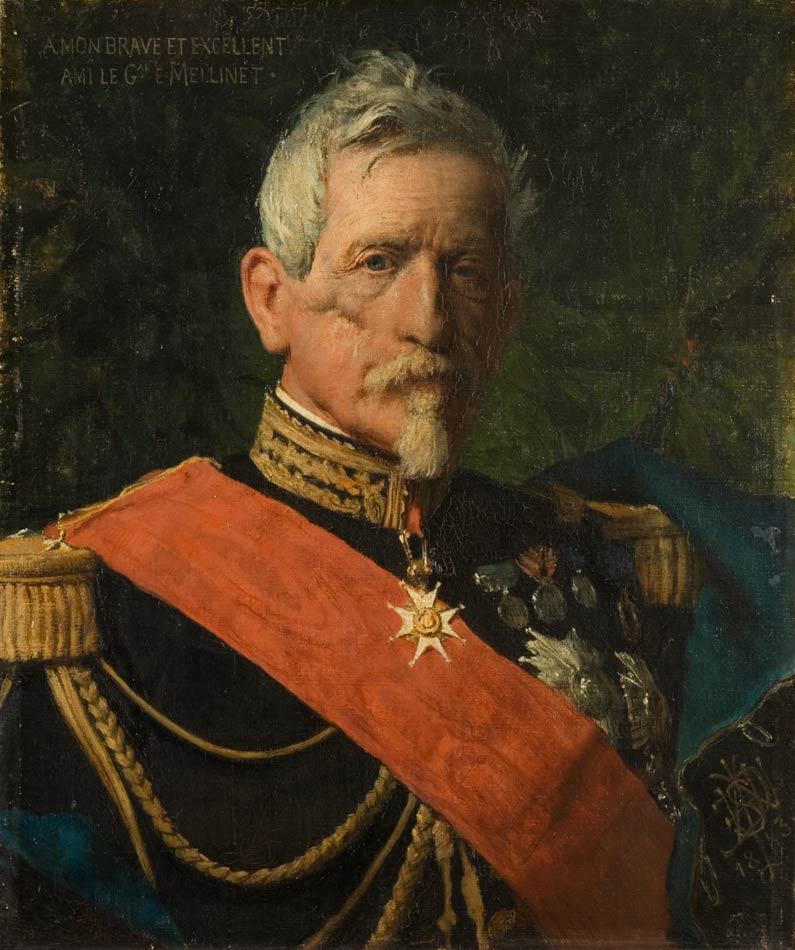
- Born: June 1, 1798; Nantes, France
- Died: January 20, 1894 (aged 95); Nantes, France
- Burial place: Miséricorde Cemetery, Nantes
- Spouse: Françoise Félicité Sébire (m. 1832–1882)
- Relatives: Anne François Mellinet (father); Camille Mellinet (brother)
- Military career
- Allegiance: France
- Service: French Army
- Years of service: 1813–1820, 1823–1863, 1870–1871
- Rank: Major General
- Commands: 5th Foot Chasseur Battalion; 32nd Line Infantry Regiment; 1st Foreign Regiment
- Conflicts: Spanish Expedition; Crimean War; Italian Campaign; Franco-Prussian War
- Awards: Grand Cross of the Legion of Honour; Crimean War Medal; Italian Campaign Medal; Saint Helena Medal; Officer of Public Instruction
- Memorials: Place Mellinet, Nantes
- Other work: Senator (1865–1870); Grand Master of the Grand Orient de France (1865–1870)

Émile Henry Mellinet (1 June 1798 – 20 January 1894) was a French general and senator. Born and died in Nantes, he was a Grand Cross of the Legion of Honour.

== Biography ==
=== Early life and family ===
Émile Mellinet was born in Nantes, the son of General Anne François Mellinet, who served in the French and later Belgian armies following the independence of Belgium, and Rosalie Malassis, from a prominent family of printers. After their divorce around 1803, Rosalie raised Émile and his elder brother Camille (born 1795), who became a printer, publisher, and man of letters. Émile's grandfathers were François Mellinet, a merchant and deputy for Loire-Inférieure in the National Convention, and Augustin-Jean Malassis, a Nantes printer-bookseller. (Note: The Malassis family also had a presence in Brest, Alençon, Évreux, and elsewhere. See Romain Malassis and Auguste Poulet-Malassis.)

In 1832, Émile married Françoise Félicité Sébire, known as "Fanny," the daughter of a Nantes merchant and sister of publisher Prosper Sébire.

=== Early military career: Empire to July Monarchy (1813–1841) ===
Following his father's footsteps, Émile pursued a military career. On 2 October 1813, he was commissioned as a lieutenant in the active National Guard of Loire-Inférieure. Assigned by General Brouard as a brevet second lieutenant in the 88th Line Infantry Regiment on 25 February 1814, he participated in the sieges of Paris, where he was wounded on 30 March. On 4 September, he was placed on supernumerary status with the 80th Line Infantry Regiment. During the Siege of Metz, he sustained a lance wound to his left thigh on 14 July 1815.

Discharged on 6 September 1815, Émile was placed on inactive status. He joined the Orne Departmental Legion on 11 March 1816 and was granted a reform pension on 11 December 1820. Recalled to active duty with the 5th Light Infantry Regiment on 22 January 1823, he took part in the Spanish Expedition. At the Siege of San Sebastián, he was shot in the left thigh on 26 April 1823 and awarded the Spanish Order of Charles III. He was promoted to lieutenant on 6 June 1823.

On 6 February 1828, he joined the 5th Infantry Regiment of the Royal Guard. After earning his officer's commission, he was breveted captain on 11 August 1830. On 16 December, he transferred to the 4th Light Infantry Regiment. Promoted to major in the 35th Line Infantry Regiment on 27 August 1839, he later commanded the 5th Foot Chasseur Battalion on 30 September 1840.

=== Service in Algeria (1841–1850) ===
In 1841, Mellinet was sent to Algeria, arriving in Mostaganem on 22 June. He quickly earned recognition from General Bugeaud, who noted in a report for May and June operations: "This senior officer, full of knowledge and honor, would be well-suited to lead a regiment." Mellinet was cited for bravery in engagements on 30–31 August and 4–5 September against the Flittas and Beni-Ouragh in the Ouarsenis mountains. In June 1842, General d'Arbouville, commander of the Oran Division, praised his actions. He was further cited on 13 July 1842 for courage during the Chélif Expedition and the capture of Blida.

With 28 years of service, three campaigns, three wounds, and seven citations, Mellinet was promoted to lieutenant-colonel of the 41st Line Infantry Regiment on 16 October 1842. Transferred to the 32nd Line Infantry Regiment on 13 June 1844, he was cited on 17 August 1841 for distinction during the resupply expedition to Mascara and the Battle of Tili-Ouanek.

Promoted to colonel of the 1st Foreign Regiment on 15 March 1846, he took command during a period of insurrection in Algeria. The regiment was organized into three battalions, stationed across Oran, Mostaganem, Mascara, Le Sig, Ténès, Khamis, and Sidi Bel Abbès. Mellinet transformed the third battalion into a model unit.

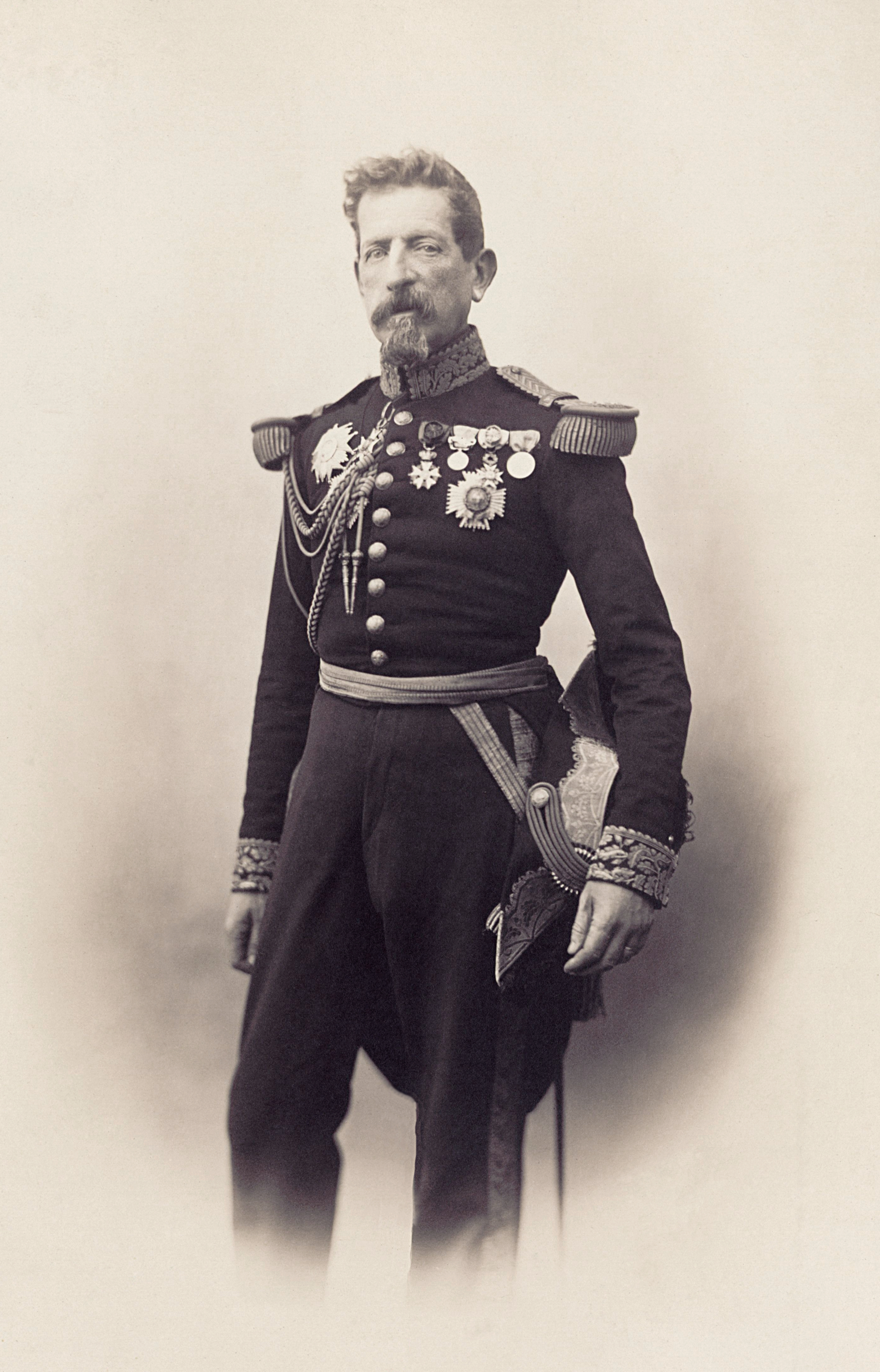
Portrait by Gustave Le Gray, 1857, Paris.

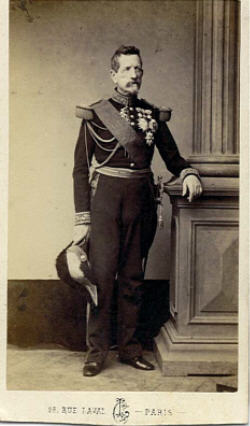
Portrait by Léon Crémière, Paris.

In February 1846, the 1st Foreign Regiment completed a road from Tenira to Sidi Bel Abbès, facilitating the establishment of a key Legion post, partly credited to Mellinet. On 7 April 1847, he led troops and a large convoy to Daya for operations under General Cavaignac in southern Oran. Following actions at Moghar el-Foukani on 27 April and Aïn Sefra on 1 May, Cavaignac commended Mellinet and his legionnaires, proposing him for the Officer's Cross of the Legion of Honour, which he received in Tlemcen.

On 1 January 1848, the Duke of Aumale, Governor of Algeria, established Sidi Bel Abbès as a subdivision under Mellinet's command. After Emir Abdelkader surrendered, General Pélissier assumed command of Oran Province. On 17 December 1848, Pélissier presented Mellinet with the regiment's new 1848-pattern flag in Oran. In April 1849, Mellinet led a column to establish the El Aricha camp. Operations continued against unrest incited by Sidi Cheikh ben Taieb in 1849, and Mellinet participated in campaigns with Colonels Maissiat and Pélissier. In 1850, he led operations against Moroccan tribal brigandage in February and September.

=== General officer (1850–1863) ===
By decree of 2 December 1850, Mellinet was promoted to brigadier general and replaced by Lieutenant-Colonel Lesueur de Givry of the 7th Line Infantry Regiment, who swapped with Colonel Bazaine of the 55th. On 15 February 1851, he commanded the 2nd Infantry Brigade in Lyon under General de Castellane. From 23 November 1851, he led the 1st Military Subdivision and 2nd Infantry Brigade in Lyon. On 31 May 1854, he took command of the 1st Infantry Brigade of the Imperial Guard. On 22 May 1855, he served as acting commander of the Imperial Guard Infantry Division in the Army of the East.

Promoted to major general on 22 June 1855, Mellinet was wounded by shrapnel in the cheek at the Siege of Sevastopol on 8 September 1855. He commanded the Imperial Guard Infantry Division, composed of regiments returning from Crimea, on 22 December 1856, and was appointed Inspector General of the 1st Infantry District for 1856. During the Italian Campaign of 1859, he distinguished himself at the Battle of Magenta, where two horses were killed under him at Ponte Nuovo, Ponte Vecchio, and Buffalora. Leading the Guard Grenadiers, he bore the brunt of the battle for several hours.

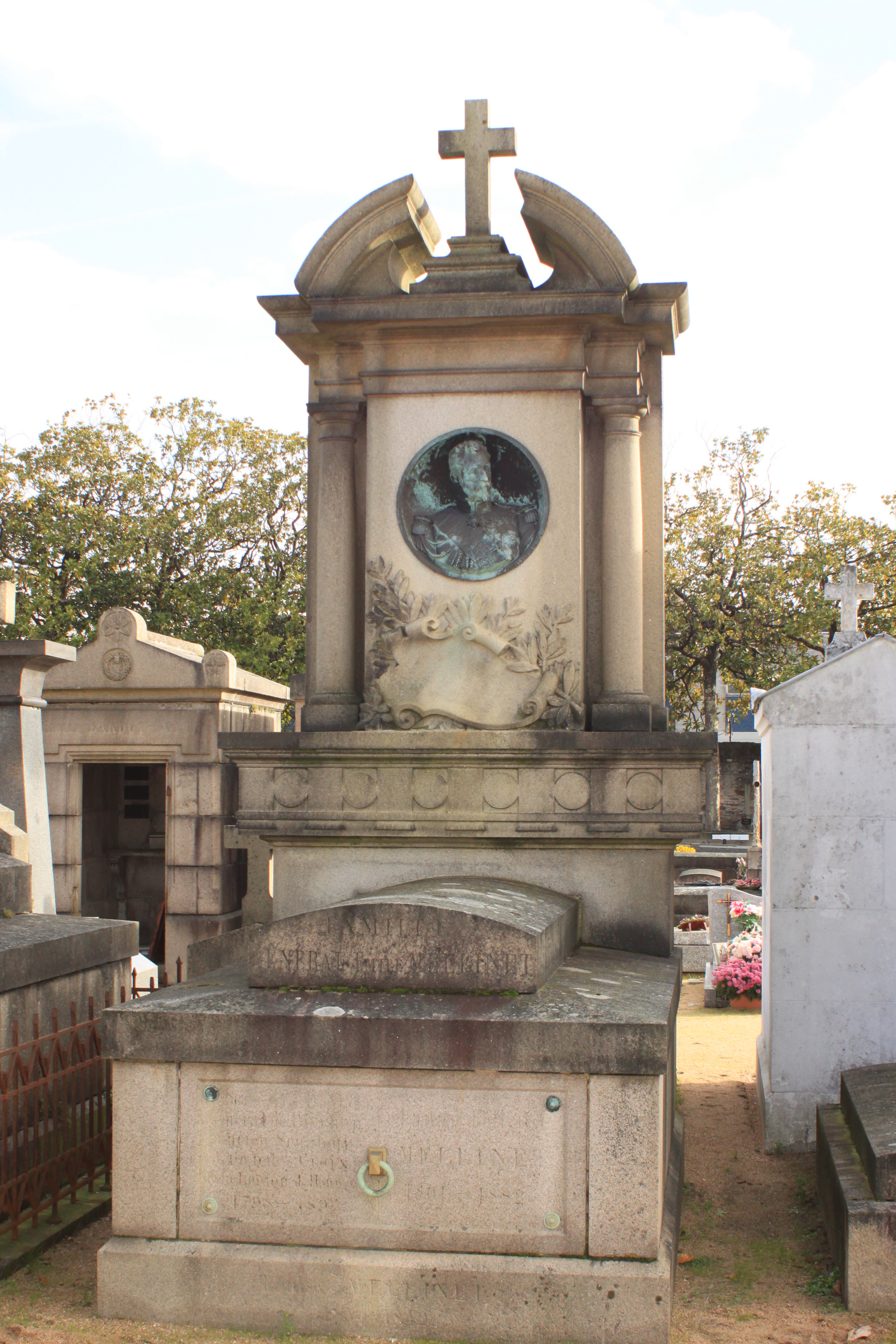
His tomb at Miséricorde Cemetery, Nantes.

=== Later career (1863–1871) ===
On 2 June 1863, Mellinet was placed in the reserve section. He was appointed to the Council of the Legion of Honour on 5 July 1863 and named Superior Commander of the Seine National Guard on 23 October 1863.

Appointed a senator on 15 March 1865, he succeeded General Bernard Pierre Magnan as Grand Master of the Grand Orient de France from 1865 to 1870. He resigned his National Guard command on 15 September 1869 but returned to service in 1870, commanding the Imperial Guard depots in Paris from 17 August 1870. On 20 August, he joined the Paris Fortifications Committee. After the French defeat, he protected Empress Eugénie, enabling her escape from Paris when the Republic was proclaimed on 4 September 1870.

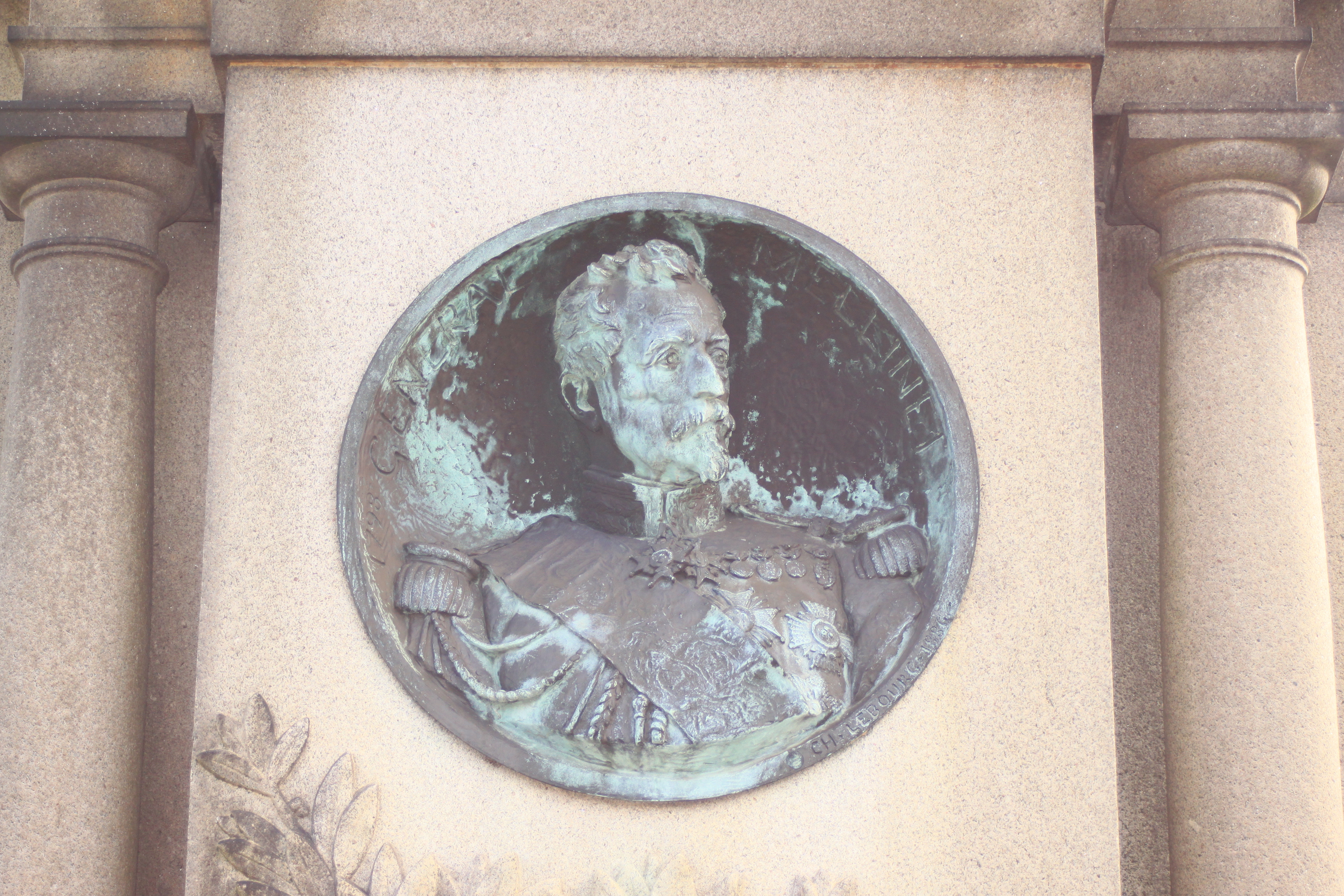
Medallion on his tomb by Charles-Auguste Lebourg.

=== Retirement and legacy (1871–1894) ===
Mellinet returned to the reserve on 8 February 1871 and retired permanently in Nantes on 1 September 1878. He became a prominent local figure, promoting arts and letters, performing at the Compiègne Theatre, and supporting regimental music. A passionate musician, he composed pieces popular among Nantais. As a bibliophile, he donated a significant collection of military works to the Ministry of War and a valuable autograph collection to the Nantes Municipal Library.

Mellinet died on 20 January 1894 from complications following exposure to cold water from a burst pipe while bedridden. He was buried beside his wife (1801–1882) at Miséricorde Cemetery in Nantes. One of the last surviving veterans of the Napoleonic Wars, he was among the final known officers.

=== Freemasonry ===
The son and grandson of Freemasons, Mellinet was initiated into the Mars et les Arts lodge in Nantes in 1815 at age 16. Fifty years later, on 9 June 1865, he became Grand Master of the Grand Orient de France, succeeding Marshal Magnan. He later became Grand Commander of the Grand College of Rites and affiliated with the Les Cœurs unis lodge. During his tenure, he upheld the principles of free discussion and opinion within the order. Despite a likely re-election, he did not seek a second term in 1870.

== Honours ==
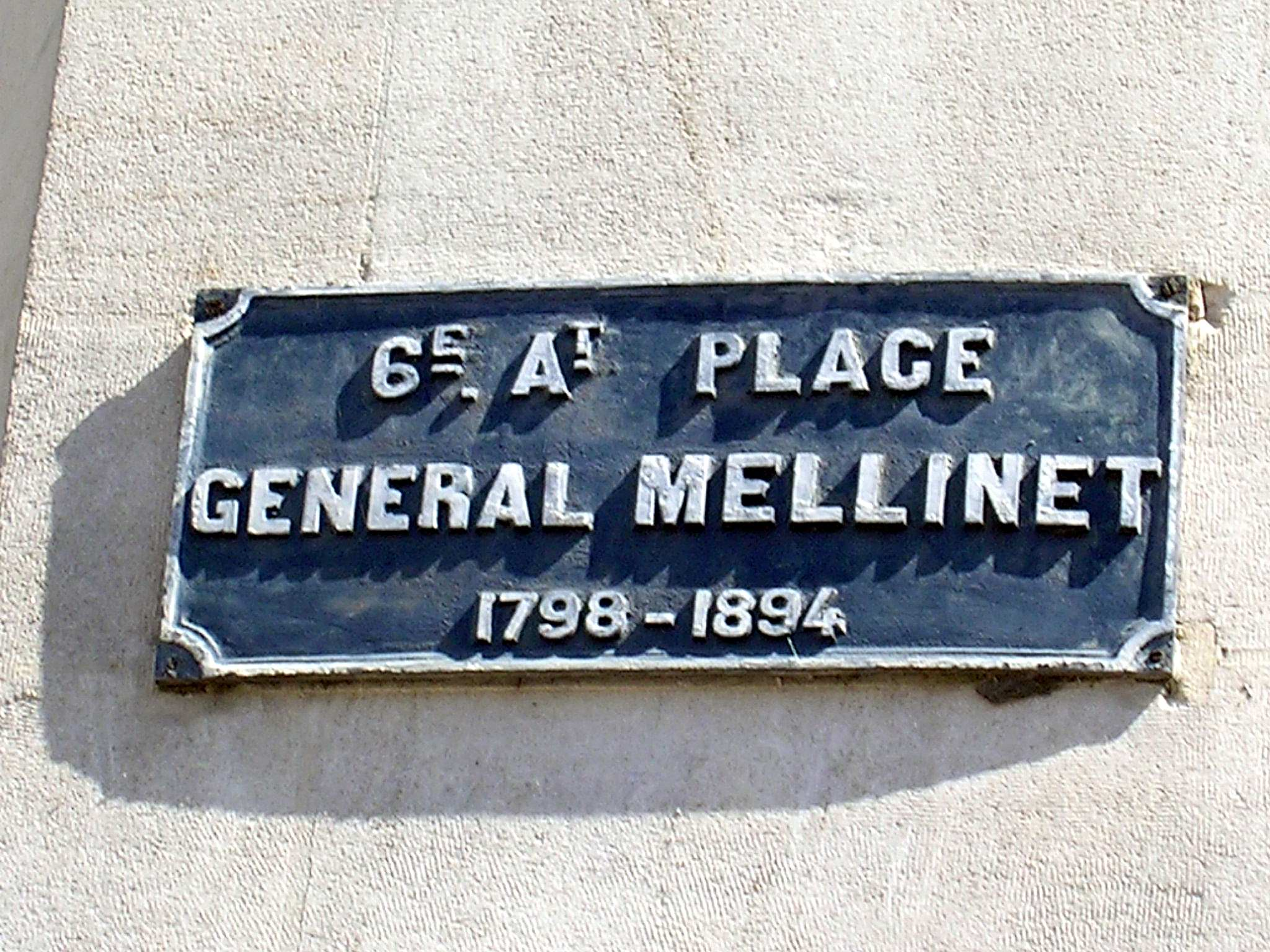
Place Mellinet in Nantes.

=== Legion of Honour ===
- Knight (27 April 1838)
- Officer (8 August 1847)
- Commander (7 January 1852)
- Grand Officer (16 June 1856)
- Grand Cross (17 June 1859)

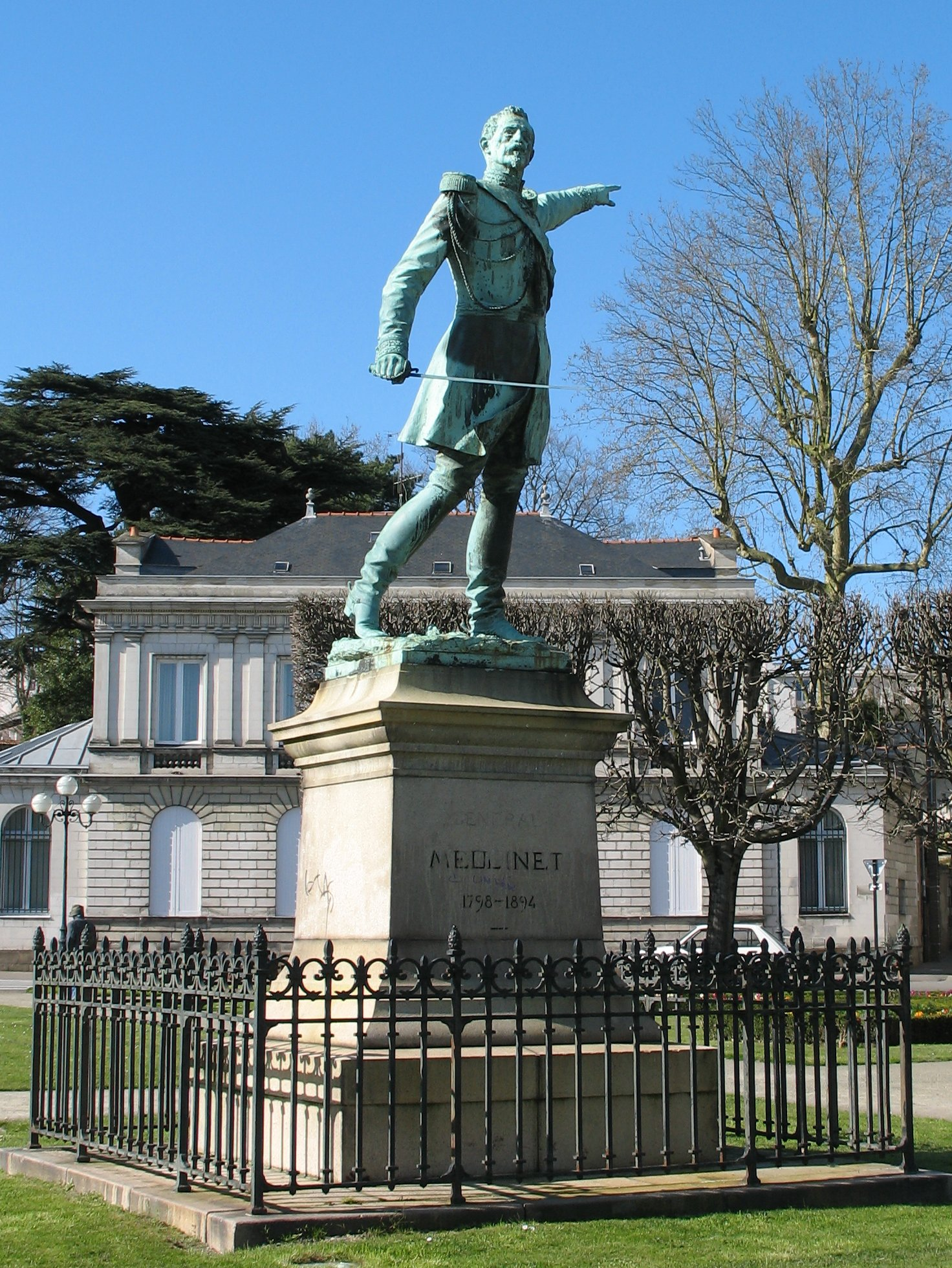
Statue of General Mellinet at Place Mellinet, Nantes.

=== Foreign decorations ===
- Knight of the Spanish Order of Charles III (23 May 1824)
- Commander of the Pontifical Order of St. Gregory the Great (6 December 1853)
- Commander of the British Order of the Bath with plaque (26 April 1855)
- Sardinian Medal of Military Valour (1859)
- Grand Cross of the Military Order of Savoy (1859)
- Grand Cross of the Ottoman Order of the Medjidie (1857–1867)
- Grand Cross of the Lion of Zähringen (Grand Duchy of Baden, 24 August 1867)
- Grand Cross of the Bavarian Order of Saint Michael (8 November 1867)
- Grand Cross of the Austrian Order of the Iron Crown (8 August 1867)
- Grand Cross of the Russian Order of Saint Alexander Nevsky (7 January 1868)
- Grand Cross of the Luxembourg Order of the Oak Crown (11 January 1868)
- Grand Cross of the Persian Order of the Lion and the Sun (April 1878)

=== Other distinctions ===
- Crimean War Medal
- Italian Campaign Medal (1859)
- Saint Helena Medal
- Officer of Public Instruction

== Legacy ==
On 10 May 1894, a square in Nantes was named Place Mellinet in his honour. A 6-meter bronze statue by Gustave Leblanc-Barbedienne, depicting Mellinet standing bareheaded in a martial pose, sword in hand, and pointing toward the enemy, was unveiled there on 29 May 1898. The stone pedestal bears the inscription "Général Mellinet 1798–1894."

== See also ==
- French Foreign Legion
- Second French Empire
- Freemasonry in France
- Battle of Magenta
- Siege of Sevastopol (1854–1855)
