= Small Cowper Madonna =

Painting by Raphael

- Artist: Raphael
- Year: c. 1504-1505
- Medium: Oil on panel
- Dimensions: 59.5 cm × 44 cm (23.4 in × 17 in)
- Location: National Gallery of Art, Washington, D.C.

The Small Cowper Madonna is a painting by the Italian High Renaissance artist Raphael, depicting Mary and Child, in a typical Italian countryside. It has been dated to around 1504–1505, the middle of the High Renaissance.

== History ==
There are no exact sources confirming for whom the Small Cowper Madonna was painted. Since it was made in Urbino, where Raphael’s main benefactors of these years, the Feltri/Roveri ruled, it was probably a private commission; the reddish hair of both Madonna and child might hint at an allusion to Maria della Rovere, daughter of La Prefettessa Giovanna della Rovere and mother of Sigismondo Varano, heir to the Duchy of Camerino right to the south. Her grandmother Battista Sforza, a famous redhead, was portrayed several times by Piero della Francesca. Both the Madonna and the Christ child closely resemble the Madonna and child on the so called Lee-version of “The Holy Family with a Lamb“, first published 1934 in The Burlington Magazine, which also depicts the family‘s mausoleum. It is widely thought that the church on the right hand side of the painting is the church of San Bernardino, where the Dukes of Urbino (where Raphael was born) were buried, and it has been suggested that the presence of the church means the painting may have been "commissioned by the family for devotional and legitimation purposes."

Around 1780, the painting was sold to the prominent art collector George Clavering-Cowper, 3rd Earl Cowper, whose surname would lend the painting its name. The painting was passed down through six generations of Cowpers before it was sold to Duveen Brothers, Inc. in 1913. In 1914, it was sold to American magnate Peter A.B. Widener, who displayed the painting at Lynnewood Hall. Peter A.B. Widener's son, Joseph E. Widener, donated the Small Cowper Madonna to the National Gallery of Art in 1942, along with the rest of Lynnewood Hall's extensive art collection.

In 2015 the National Gallery of Art loaned the Small Cowper Madonna to the Worcester Art Museum in Massachusetts (U.S.) to be exhibited alongside The Virgin and Child (The Northbrook Madonna). The Northbrook Madonna is in the Worcester Art Museum's permanent collection and was once attributed to Raphael. One hope of the exhibition was to identify the artist who painted the Northbrook Madonna. The painter of the Northbrook Madonna was later identified by the museum as perhaps being Domenico Alfani, a close friend of Raphael's whose works have often been misattributed to the better-known artist.

== Description ==
Sitting in the center of the work in a bright red dress is the Madonna. She is fair skinned with blonde hair. She sits comfortably on a wooden bench. Across her lap is a dark drapery upon which her right hand delicately sits. There appears to be a sheer translucent ribbon elegantly flowing across the top of her dress and behind her head. The faintest golden halo miraculously surrounds her head. In her left hand she holds the baby Christ, who embraces her with one arm around her back, the other around her neck. He looks back over his shoulder with a coy smile. Behind them, a beautifully clear and bright day unfolds. Off in the distance two figures appear to be ambling toward a reflective pond, enjoying the green scenery around them. A large structure stands at the end of a long path, thought to be the Church of San Bernardino in Urbino.

== See also ==
- Niccolini-Cowper Madonna
