= Deruta =

- Comune
- Comune di Deruta
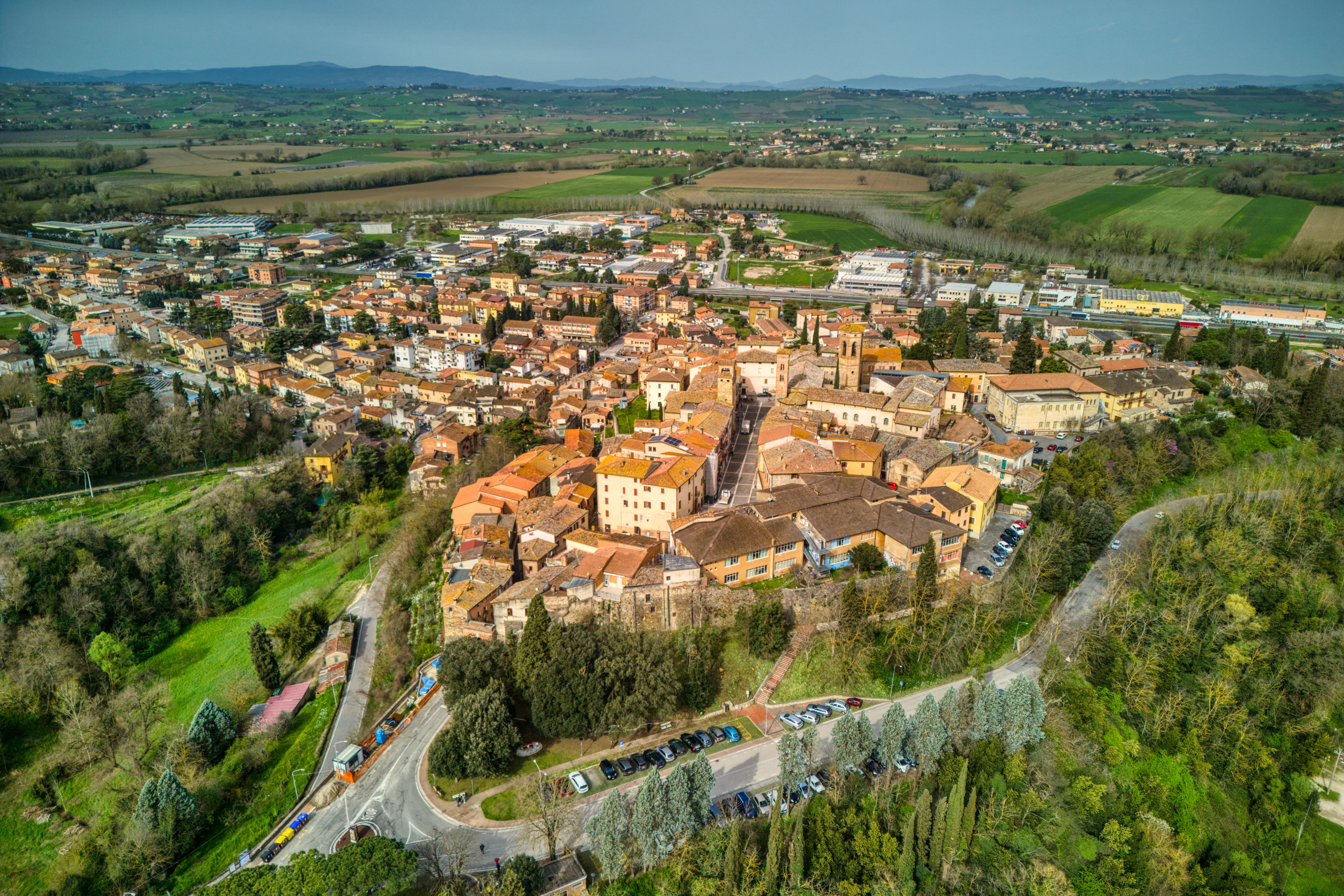
- View of Deruta

- Location within Italy Location within Umbria
- Coordinates: 42.982129°N 12.419753°E
- Country: Italy
- Region: Umbria
- Province: Perugia (PG)

Government
  - Mayor: Alvaro Verbena

Area
  - Total: 44 km^{2} (17 sq mi)
- Elevation: 234 m (768 ft)

Population (1 January 2025)
  - Total: 9,530
  - Density: 220/km^{2} (560/sq mi)
- Demonym: Derutesi
- Time zone: UTC+1 (CET)
  - Summer (DST): UTC+2 (CEST)
- Postal code: 06053
- Dialing code: 075
- Patron saint: St. Catherine
- Saint day: November 25
- Website: Official website

Deruta is a hill town and comune in the Province of Perugia in the Umbria region of central Italy.

Long known as a center of refined maiolica manufacture, Deruta remains known for its ceramics, which are exported worldwide. It is one of I Borghi più belli d'Italia ("The most beautiful villages of Italy").

== Etymology ==
According to a traditional interpretation reported by Adone Palmieri, Deruta was formerly called Druida, a name connected with the druids of the Gauls. It was later thought to derive from the participle derutus ("ruined"), in reference to destruction. This explanation is linked to a tradition that, after the burning of Perugia, fugitives took refuge there, leading to the settlement being associated with ruin.

Another interpretation connects the name to Eruta, referring to the extraction of clay in the area since antiquity.

== History ==
Deruta is believed to have very ancient origins, with early names including Druida and later Perugia Vecchia. Historical accounts that it was founded by the Gauls or during the reign of Tarquinius Priscus lack evidence. The location of the modern town does not correspond exactly to the ancient settlement, which is thought to have been on a nearby hill where a few ruins, known as Perugia Vecchia, remain. By 1103 the three parishes already existed.

Deruta was first mentioned in the 12th century, when Perugia conquered it and established the town as a border fortress.

Pope Urban IV is said to have died in the area while returning from Todi, and his body was brought to Perugia.

Throughout the 14th and 15th centuries, Deruta experienced frequent changes of rulers, as well as repeated attacks and outbreaks of plague.

In 1391, due to ongoing conflicts among nearby cities including Assisi, Todi, Perugia, and Foligno, construction of a fortress began.

Braccio Fortebraccio attacked and devastated the surrounding village and entered the town, which was under siege; the walls were only restored in 1428.

Pope Eugene IV granted special privileges to Deruta and had the town re-fortified, parts of which remain today.

In 1500, Spanish forces passing through set fire to various houses, and the walls were restored again in 1523.

In the 16th century the town underwent reconstruction and revival under the Baglioni family. In 1534 Braccio Baglioni sacked Deruta. Later in the century the town aligned with the Church during the 1540 Salt War and was subsequently exempted from certain taxes.

Deruta remained under Papal control until 1860, except during periods of French rule from 1798 to 1800 under the Roman Republic and from 1809 to 1814 under Napoleon. In the mid-19th century the municipality had a population of 4,060 inhabitants. Of these, 1,408 lived in the main settlement, while 2,652 resided in the countryside.

In 1928 the frazione of Pomonte was separated from Deruta and transferred to the municipality of Gualdo Cattaneo.

== Geography ==
Deruta lies on the left bank of the Tiber River, at the foot of a chain of hills separating the Tiber Valley from the plain of Foligno. The surrounding territory is partly elevated and partly flat. The town lies 8 miles (13 km) from Perugia, 20 miles (32 km) from Todi, 7 miles (11 km) from Marsciano, 4 miles (6.4 km) from Torgiano, and 6 miles (9.7 km) from Bettona.

=== Subdivisions ===
The municipality includes the localities of Casalina, Castelleone, Deruta, Fanciullata, Ponte Nuovo, Ponticelli, Ripabianca, San Benedetto, San Niccolò di Celle, Sant'Angelo di Celle, Venturello, Viale.

In 2021, 836 people lived in rural dispersed dwellings not assigned to any named locality. At the time, the most populous localities were Deruta proper (4,089), San Niccolò di Celle (1,153), and Sant'Angelo di Celle (975).

== Economy ==
Deruta was long renowned for the production of fine pottery, including lustreware and iridescent ceramics, sometimes with gilded decoration. In the 16th century there were about 50 kilns in operation, while by the mid-19th century only five remained.

Agriculture was also significant, supported by the fertility of the territory. Olive oil and grain were processed locally, with several mills in operation.

=== Ceramics ===
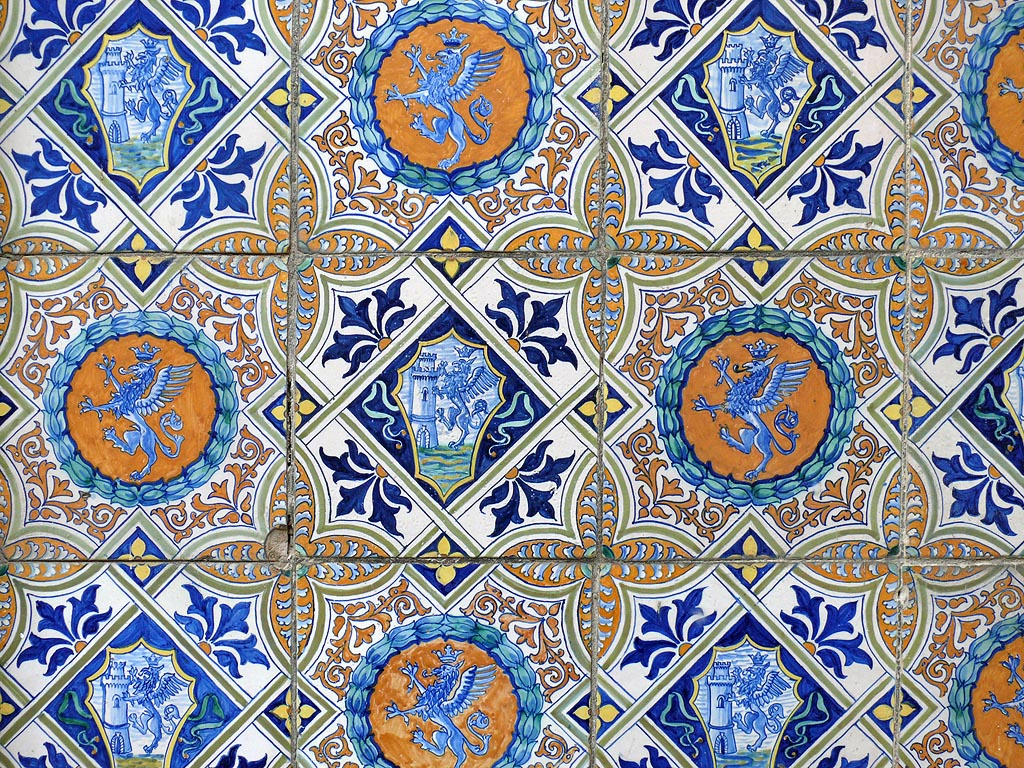
Deruta, maiolica tiles

The first factory is believed to date to 1401, founded by Agostino di Antonio di Duccio, a pupil of Luca della Robbia. By 1501 a renowned factory was operating, although some accounts place its establishment at 1525.

Deruta's ceramics were particularly valued for their metallic luster, and especially for maiolica decorated with grotesque motifs on a blue background, similar to Faenza, and for figurative maiolica inspired by Urbino. A master known as il Frate also contributed significantly.

The local production found its artistic peak in the 15th and early 16th century, with highly characteristic local styles of maiolica, such as the "Bella Donna" plates with conventional portraits of beauties, whose names appear on fluttering banderoles with flattering inscriptions. The lack of fuel enforced low firing temperatures, but from the beginning of the 16th century, Deruta became (with Gubbio) a specialist centre for metallic lustreware in golds and ruby red, added over the glaze. In the 16th century Deruta produced the so-called "Rafaellesque" ware, decorated with fine arabesques and grottesche on a fine white ground.

== Religion ==
=== San Francesco ===
The church of San Francesco is the main Catholic place of worship in Deruta. Consecrated in 1388 after reconstruction following a severe earthquake, it has a single nave that contains a series of notable frescoes.

Among these are Domenico Alfani's Madonna with Child between Saint Francis and Saint Bernardino of Siena, frescoes of Saint Sebastian, Saints Peter and Paul, the martyrdom of a saint, and two scenes from the life of Saint Catherine of Alexandria.

The Chapel of the Rosary, dating to 1846, houses a statue of the Virgin of the Rosary. The apse contains a 14th-century fresco of the Resurrection of Christ. Additional frescoes depict the Madonna with Child among Saints Peter, Paul, Ludovico of Toulouse, Catherine of Alexandria, and Francis of Assisi; Christ in the house of Martha and Mary; and Saint Anthony of Padua.

The church's 18th-century ceramic floor, originally from the church of Sant'Angelo, is now preserved in the Museo Regionale della Ceramica. The church was damaged in the October 2016 earthquake and reopened to the public in 2017.

The central apse once displayed a tempera panel with the Virgin and Child, Saint Bernardino, and Saint Francis, signed by Nicolò da Foligno in 1458; it is now held in the Pinacoteca of Perugia. The apse walls are believed to have been painted by Giotto's pupils, now covered by whitewash. In the adjoining convent, frescoes in the cloister include works by the school of Giotto, depicting the Virgin enthroned with Christ and a bishop saint.

The church contains an organ by Vici. The adjoining convent, founded in 1008, originally belonged to the Benedictines and later passed to the Conventual Franciscans. In 1264 Pope Urban IV is said to have died there, possibly by poisoning.

=== Madonna dei Bagni ===
The sanctuary of Madonna dei Bagni stands on the Colle del Bagno, a hill just outside the center of Deruta. Built in 1687 at the site of a reported miraculous event, it originated when a fragment of maiolica depicting the Virgin and Child was discovered fixed to an oak tree. This image became an object of veneration, attracting the sick and pilgrims who left ex-votos on the tree. The sanctuary was constructed around the oak, and local ceramists began producing ex-votos for worshippers. Over three centuries, more than seven hundred maiolica tiles have accumulated here, offering a significant record of the technical and stylistic evolution of Deruta maiolica.

=== Other religious buildings ===
- Sant'Antonio: church with frescoes by Bartolommeo and Giovanni Battista Caporali, rises at the end of a narrow street, Via Mastro Giorgio.
- Madonna del Divino Amore on Piazza Cavour.
- Madonna delle Piagge church along the Tiberina road, at the foot of the old town, yet another church, clad in a colorful array of ceramic tiles.

== Culture ==
=== Museo della Ceramica ===
Established in 1898, the museum is claimed to be the oldest of its kind in Italy. Since 1998 it has been housed in the 14th-century Convent of San Francesco. The museum documents local ceramic production from the medieval period to the 20th century, including a notable section on lustre maiolica, and the more complex 17th-century compendiaria production. The museum also features thematic displays on pharmacy ceramics, 16th-century maiolica floors, and votive plaques inspired by the nearby sanctuary of Madonna dei Bagni.

=== Pinacoteca Comunale ===
The Pinacoteca Comunale is housed in the 14th-century Palazzo dei Consoli, whose lower section retains Gothic features while the upper part reflects 18th-century remodeling. he collection, formed from the early 20th century and enriched especially in 1931 by the donation of works from the heir of the 17th-century collector Lione Pascoli, includes paintings from the church of San Francesco and surrounding areas. Notable works include Madonna dei Consoli and the Gonfalone of Saint Anthony Abate by Niccolò Alunno, and Eterno and Saints Romano and Rocco by Perugino.

The collection donated by Lione Pascoli includes works by Niccolò di Liberatore, called Alunno, Giovan Battista Gaulli, Sebastiano Conca, Francesco Trevisani, Antonio Amorosi, Francesco Graziani and Pieter Van Bloemen.

=== Other cultural sites ===
The town's historic center preserves the layout of the medieval village, including portions of the walls restored in the 15th and 16th centuries.

At the summit of the hill in Deruta lies the principal rectangular square, known as the Piazza dei Consoli, paved under Simonetto Baglioni. Around it stand the municipal residence, schools, prisons, and archives, as well as a bell tower with a public clock decorated in majolica.

At one end of the square stands a twelve-sided fountain, designed with a water system by Fiorenzo Cherubini of Perugia and executed by the architect Boschi. It was first put into operation on 2 March 1848.

== Notable people ==
Deruta was the birthplace of several notable figures, including Leonardo Berardo, who was Podestà of Perugia in 1192; Egidio Spiritali, ambassador to Pope Clement V; the humanist Francesco Maturanzio, who died in 1518; and Girolamo Rossetti, a theologian. Other figures include Girolamo Fiori, historian of Perugia; Sigismondo Mancini, theologian at the Council of Trent; Agostino da Deruta, author of musical works; Eusebio da Deruta, writer of theological treatises; Antonio Chinelli, noted for learning and virtue; and Giovanni Battista Cocchi, a respected professor and author.

Among the principal families in the 19th century were the Vitalivi, Magrini, Grazia, Morganti, Cherubini, Andreoli, Tancioni, Calzolari, and Pascoli.

Deruta was the birthplace of Girolamo Diruta, an organist, music theorist, and composer.
