= Francesco Matarazzo =

Italian historian (1443–1518)

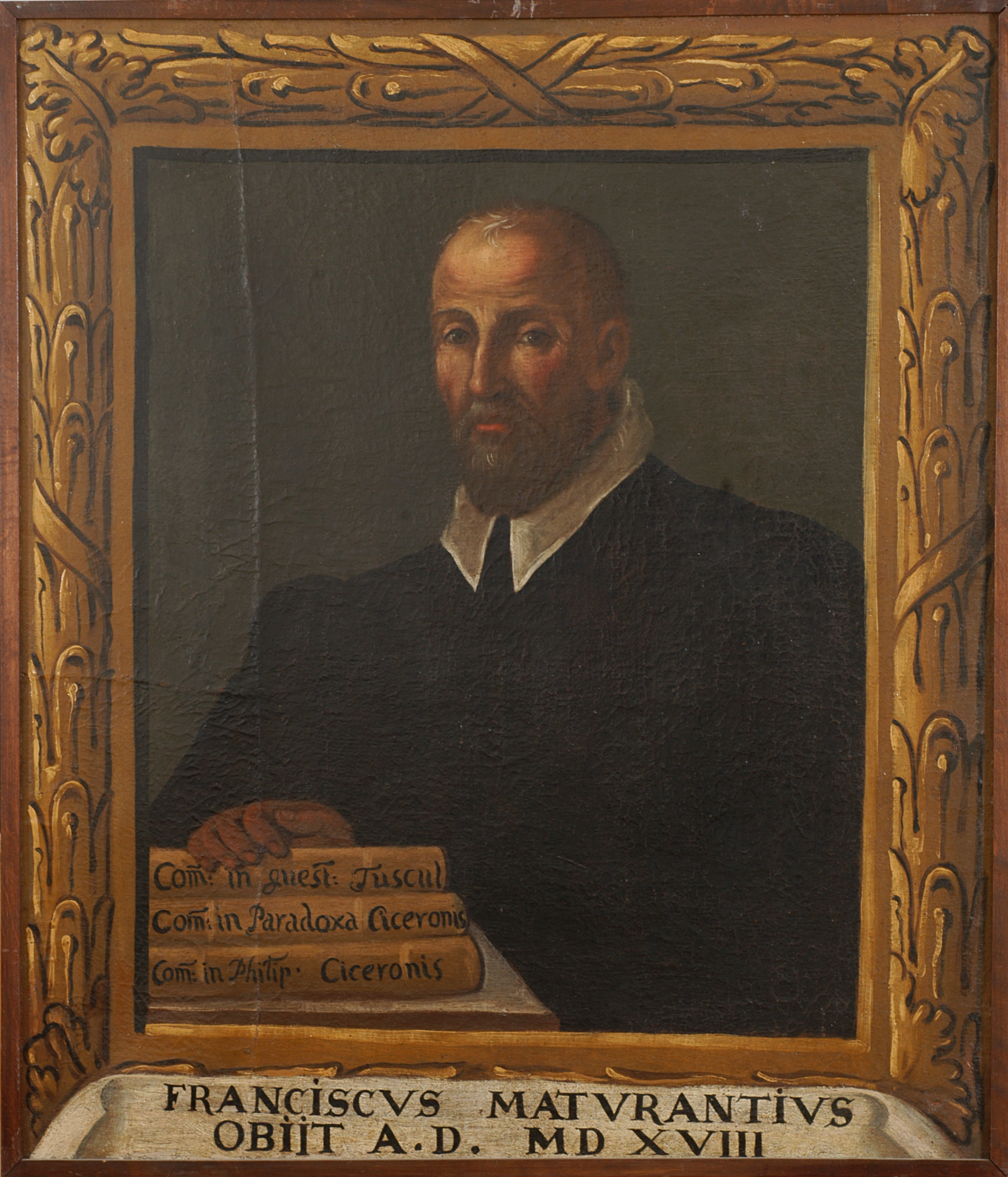
Francesco Matarazzo (1443 - 1518), Italian historian of the European Renaissance

Francesco Matarazzo or Maturanzio (1443 – August 21, 1518) was an Italian historian of the European Renaissance. His fame rests largely on his masterwork Chronicles of the City of Perugia 1492–1503 which has become a primary source for many later historians of the Italian Renaissance and in particular the city of Perugia.

== Life ==
Although the exact date of his birth in unknown, it is believed that Matarazzo was born about the year 1443 in the small town of Deruta, near Perugia. Little is known of his family, but he is said to have been of noble descent, which would have guaranteed him an extensive education. As a teenager he was chosen to compose the Latin inscriptions that were inscribed beneath the portraits of famous citizens of Perugia that Braccio Baglione had painted to decorate his palace in the city. In 1464 he was teaching in the University of Ferrara and three years later he was assistant to the celebrated humanist teacher Ognibene da Lonigo at Vicenza.

In 1472, he traveled to Greece and settled in Rhodes to study the Greek language. Writing to a friend he reported, "I already speak the language with such fluency that you might think I had been born and brought up in Greece." After wide-ranging travels in the Mediterranean, he settled in Perugia circa 1475 where we find him designated as reverendi domini Perusinae civitatis secretarius dignissimus. The next seventeen years of his life were spent in his native city.

On 7 March 1485, in celebration of the feast of St. Thomas Aquinas at the Basilica of Santa Maria sopra Minerva in Rome, Matarazzo delivered the annual encomium in honor of the "angelic doctor" to the members of the Dominican studium generale, the future Pontifical University of Saint Thomas Aquinas, Angelicum.

In 1486 he was appointed Professor of Rhetoric in the University of Perugia.

In 1492 he succeeded Ognibene as Professor of the Humanities at Vicenza where he spent four or five years.

The magistrates of Perugia ordered his return to the city under penalties and upon his return Matarazzo, contrary to his own expectations, was given a warm reception. "Men do me honour; as I pass through the streets I am saluted; I am loved by the Baglioni, and by all other citizens besides." The following year he was appointed Professor in the University of Perugia at a salary of 110 ducats, guaranteed by the taxes of two villages which were assigned to him.

The rest of his life was spent in Perugia in an honourable position, in which, according to the usage of the time, political and literary employment were assigned to him in turns. He was frequently charged with the composition of funeral orations over distinguished citizens. In 1503 he became the State Chancellor; he went as ambassador to Rome and Florence and to other States, and continued in active service of the State till 1513.

Concerning his death we have the chronicle of his friend Teseo Alfani, which reads: "On this Friday morning, August 20, 1518, before dawn, died the most excellent Francesco Matarazzo, who had been down with fever for about a month. All the city was sore at heart, for the man had great qualities, and stood indeed above all others, not only in our city, but almost in the whole of Italy. May God have pardoned his sins. He was about seventy-five years old."

== Chronicles of the City of Perugia 1492–1503 ==
At the time this chronicle was written, the city of Perugia was one of the many Renaissance centers of political strife, moral outrage and ruthless violence. The book relates the story of two rival families, the Oddi and the Baglioni, who are locked in a deadly struggle for possession of the city. In 1492 the victorious Baglioni are the reigning overlords of the Republic. The Oddi family and its attendant army live in exile in the valley between Perugia and Assisi where they conduct a long and oppressive guerrilla war against their rivals; and in the process devastate the Umbrian land and impoverish the common citizen.

Considering that Matarazzo wrote under the patronage of the Baglione, many critics regard the author as biased in his selection and presentation of historical material.

Several sheets of the manuscript have been lost and the story begins and ends abruptly.

== Notes and references ==
- Burckhardt, Jacob (1904). The Civilization of the Renaissance in Italy. Trans. S. G. C. Middlemore. The Macmillan company.
- Heller, Erich (1988). "Burckhardt and Nietzsche". The Importance of Nietzsche: Ten Essays. Chicago, Il.: University of Chicago Press. pp. 39–40. ISBN 0-226-32637-3.
- Matarazzo, Francesco (1905). Chronicles of the City of Perugia 1492-1503. Trans. Edward Strachan Morgan. London: J. M. Dent & Co.
