= Casalina =

- Frazione
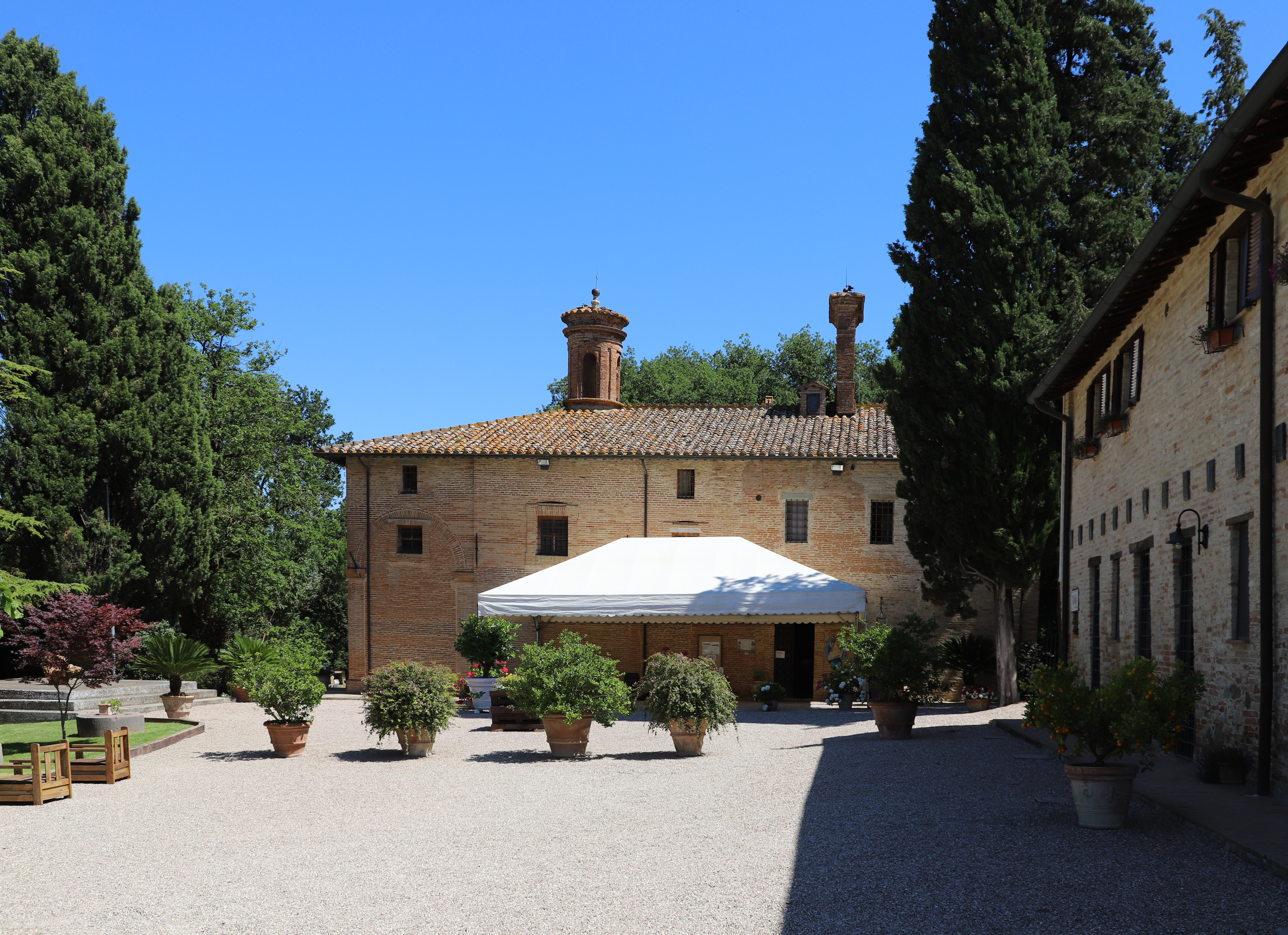

- Location of Casalina in Italy
- Coordinates: 42°57′00″N 12°24′06″E
- Country: Italy
- Region: Umbria
- Province: Perugia
- Comune: Deruta
- Elevation: 168 m (551 ft)

Population (2021)
  - Total: 386
- Time zone: UTC+1 (CET)
  - Summer (DST): UTC+2 (CEST)
- Dialing code: 0742

Casalina is a frazione of the comune of Deruta in the Province of Perugia, Umbria, central Italy. It stands at an elevation of 168 metres above sea level. At the time of the Istat census of 2021 it had 386 inhabitants.

== History ==
In the mid-19th century, the locality had a population of 318 inhabitants forming 56 families in 56 houses. The surrounding lands were described as very fertile, and the inhabitants were almost all engaged in agriculture.

At the Rocca of Casalina the Cassinese monks of San Pietro of Perugia possessed an extensive landed estate.

== Geography ==
Casalina lies 13 miles (21 km) from Perugia on the road leading to Todi, which is 14 miles (23 km) away. The river Tiber flows about 0.2 miles (0.32 km) from the settlement along its left bank.

== Religion and culture ==
=== Religious buildings ===
The church of San Girolamo serves as the parish church of Casalina. The building is vaulted and contains an organ. The feast of Saint Jerome, the titular saint of the church, is celebrated on 30 September.

The church of Madonna delle Grazie is a very small church located in Casalina.

=== Roman tombs ===
Ruins of ancient Roman tombs are visible in Casalina.
