= Ripabianca =

- Frazione
- Location of Ripabianca in Italy
- Coordinates: 42°56′25″N 12°24′15″E
- Country: Italy
- Region: Umbria
- Province: Perugia
- Comune: Deruta
- Elevation: 230 m (750 ft)

Population (2001)
  - Total: 488
- Time zone: UTC+1 (CET)
  - Summer (DST): UTC+2 (CEST)
- Dialing code: 0742

Ripabianca is a frazione of the comune of Deruta in the Province of Perugia, Umbria, central Italy. It stands at an elevation of 230 metres above sea level. At the time of the Istat census of 2001 it had 488 inhabitants.

Famous for Matteuccia Di Francesco, the first woman to be sentenced to Witch trials in Europe.
