= Sant'Angelo di Celle =

- Frazione
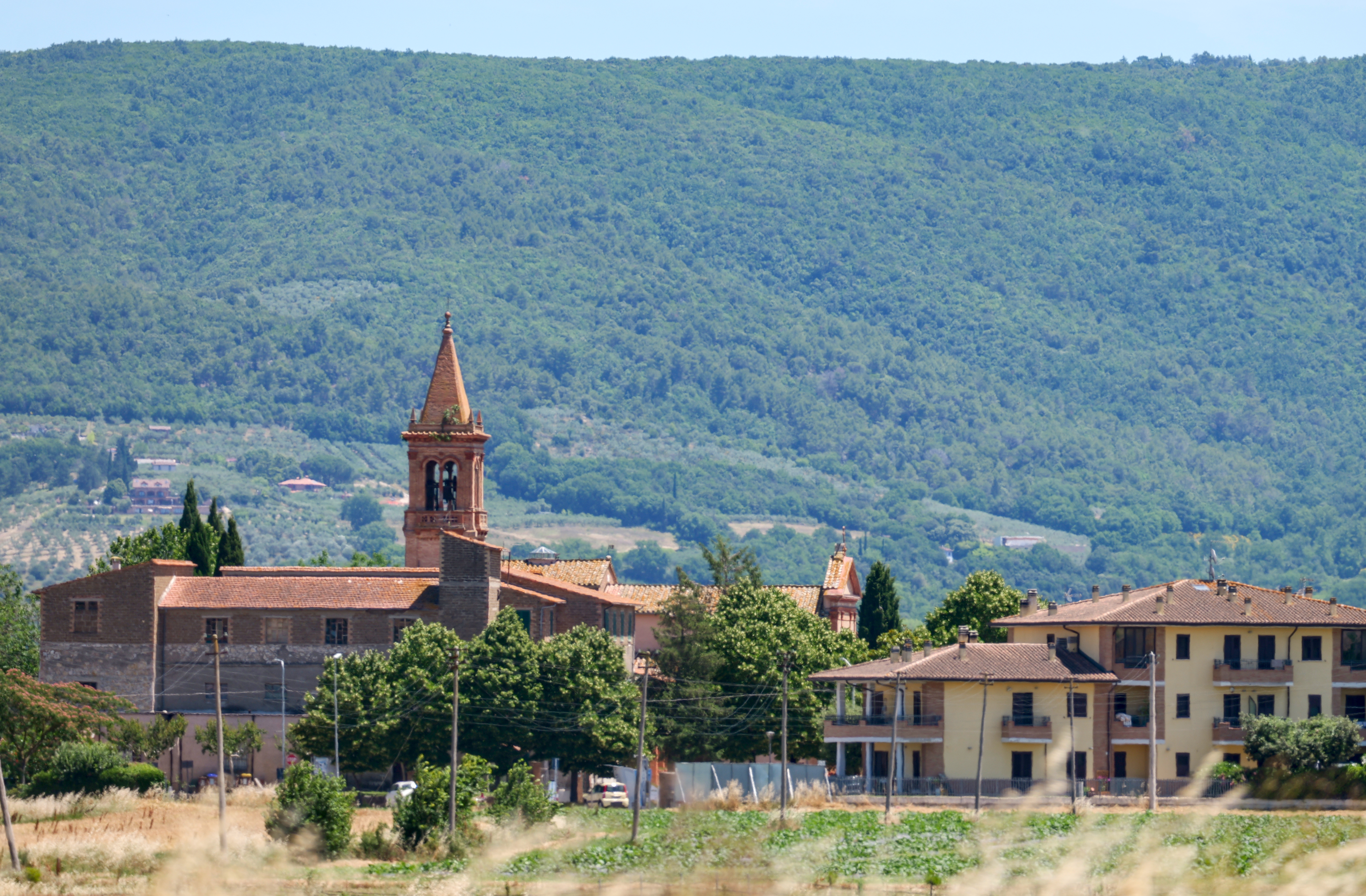

- Location of Sant'Angelo di Celle in Italy
- Coordinates: 42°59′52″N 12°23′02″E
- Country: Italy
- Region: Umbria
- Province: Perugia
- Comune: Deruta
- Elevation: 174 m (571 ft)

Population (2001)
  - Total: 749
- Time zone: UTC+1 (CET)
  - Summer (DST): UTC+2 (CEST)
- Dialing code: 0742

Sant'Angelo di Celle is a frazione of the comune of Deruta in the Province of Perugia, Umbria, central Italy. It stands at an elevation of 174 metres above sea level. At the 2001 Istat census, it had 749 inhabitants.
