= Matteuccia de Francesco =

- Born: 1388; Ripabianca, Umbria, Papal States
- Died: 20 March 1428 (aged 39–40); Todi, Umbria, Papal States
- Cause of death: Executed by burning for witchcraft
- Other name: "Witch of Ripabianca"
- Known for: Being one of the first Europeans executed for witchcraft in the 15th century

Matteuccia de Francesco (also known as Matteuccia da Todi; c. 1388 – d. 20 March 1428) was an Italian woman and traditional healer from the Papal States. She became one of the earliest victims of the witch trials in the early modern period.

== Biography ==
Matteuccia was born in Ripabianca, Umbria in 1388. Known locally as Domina Herbarum ("Lady of the Herbs"), she made her living as a herbalist and spiritual healer who provided remedies to paying clients. Clients commonly hired her to perform love spells, or incantations to improve their personal relationships. She also performed rites that blended superstition with Catholic dogma, such as treating alleged victims of demonic possession through rituals and prayer. Other treatments she offered likely included calendula for toothaches, and prescribing St. John's wort for symptoms of the menopause.

In 1416, military leader Braccio da Montone captured the city of Todi in Umbria. Braccio, who had attracted the ire of the Catholic Church for ignoring orders from papal authorities, became one of Matteuccia's clients. He served as her most influential protector until his death in 1424. Two years later, missionary Bernardino of Siena visited Todi to preach and help the city revise its governance structures. He also warned locals about the perceived threat of witchcraft, identifying Matteuccia as a potential witch in the process. Although it is unknown what actions Bernardino took to stop Matteuccia during this time, it is likely that his efforts brought her to the attention of local authorities.

=== Allegations of witchcraft ===
Accounts of Matteuccia's activities over the next two years derive primarily from records of her witchcraft trial. She was ultimately charged with thirty instances of supposed witchcraft, with her powers said to derive from Satan. Matteuccia was alleged to have summoned the Devil in the form of a goat, which she rode across water and through the air; she also met with other witches at the Walnut Tree of Benevento, a legendary gathering place for sorcerers. At these meetings, the Devil ordered her to "go around destroying children and other wicked things."

In 1426, Matteuccia allegedly directed a man who claimed to be "possessed by a spirit" to sleep atop the tomb of a pagan. She advised clients with similar claims to acquire pagan bones and bring them to a crossroads, where they would repeatedly recite the Pater Noster and Ave Maria. The next year, Matteuccia prescribed a herbal contraceptive to an unmarried woman who was having an affair with a local priest. From September until her arrest, Matteuccia also allegedly caused the death of more than one hundred infants.

Many of Matteuccia's clients were women seeking help with their marriages. She directed women in abusive relationships to create wax effigies of their violent husbands, which they would place in their marital beds while chanting a spell to end the abuse. Nonetheless, some of her clients were men, such as a jilted suitor who requested Matteuccia's help in making his lover's new husband impotent. On another occasion, she allegedly produced a herbal tonic that cured a man with paralysis. This incident formed the basis of a charge against her, as papal authorities deemed curing the man to be defying God's will.

=== Trial ===
Matteuccia was arrested in March 1428. While under interrogation, she was said to have "confessed spontaneously... saying that she had no defence", though she was nonetheless given a few days to prepare one. Her confession was possibly the result of torture.

On 20 March 1428, Matteuccia's trial began. Proceedings were held at the Tribunal de Malefici ("Court of Evildoers"), led by Captain Lorenzo di Surdis of Rome and commissioned by Pope Martin V. Bernardino da Siena was one of the witnesses who testified against Matteuccia, and other attendees court dubbed her the "Witch of Ripabianca". The court found her guilty of being "a woman of a bad life and reputation, public enchantress, sorceress, evil spell caster, and witch". Because she could not afford the large fine demanded by the court, she was sentenced to death.

Her sentence, which was announced by the ringing of church bells, was carried out on the same day. She was led atop a donkey to Todi's town square with her hands tied behind her back, and a bishop's mitre upon her head to mock her. There, she was publicly burned alive on a pyre.

== Analysis ==
Historian Marina Montesano suggests that Matteuccia was likely prosecuted because of her affiliation with Braccio da Montone, a warlord who had defied the Catholic Church. According to historians Katherine Jansen and Richard Golden, Bernardino's preaching directly created the conditions for her execution.

Researchers including Mary Ellen Snodgrass and Eleanor Johnson posit that Matteuccia was also targeted because she took actions to help victims of domestic violence within a highly patriarchal society. Academic Gina M. Miele suggests that Matteuccia's traditional remedies posed a threat to male physicians at a time when women were excluded from formal medicine. She may have also been an economic threat, as her herbal prescriptions likely represented a cheaper alternative to doctors' fees.

== Legacy ==
In 2013, Ornella Muti originated the role of Matteuccia in a play adapting her life, Processo alla strega ("Witch Trial"), written by Silvano Spada. The Agricultural Institute of Todi maintains a garden of medicinal herbs in Matteuccia's honour known as the Orto della strega Matteuccia ("Matteuccia the Witch's Garden").
