= Witches of Benevento =

Medieval legend

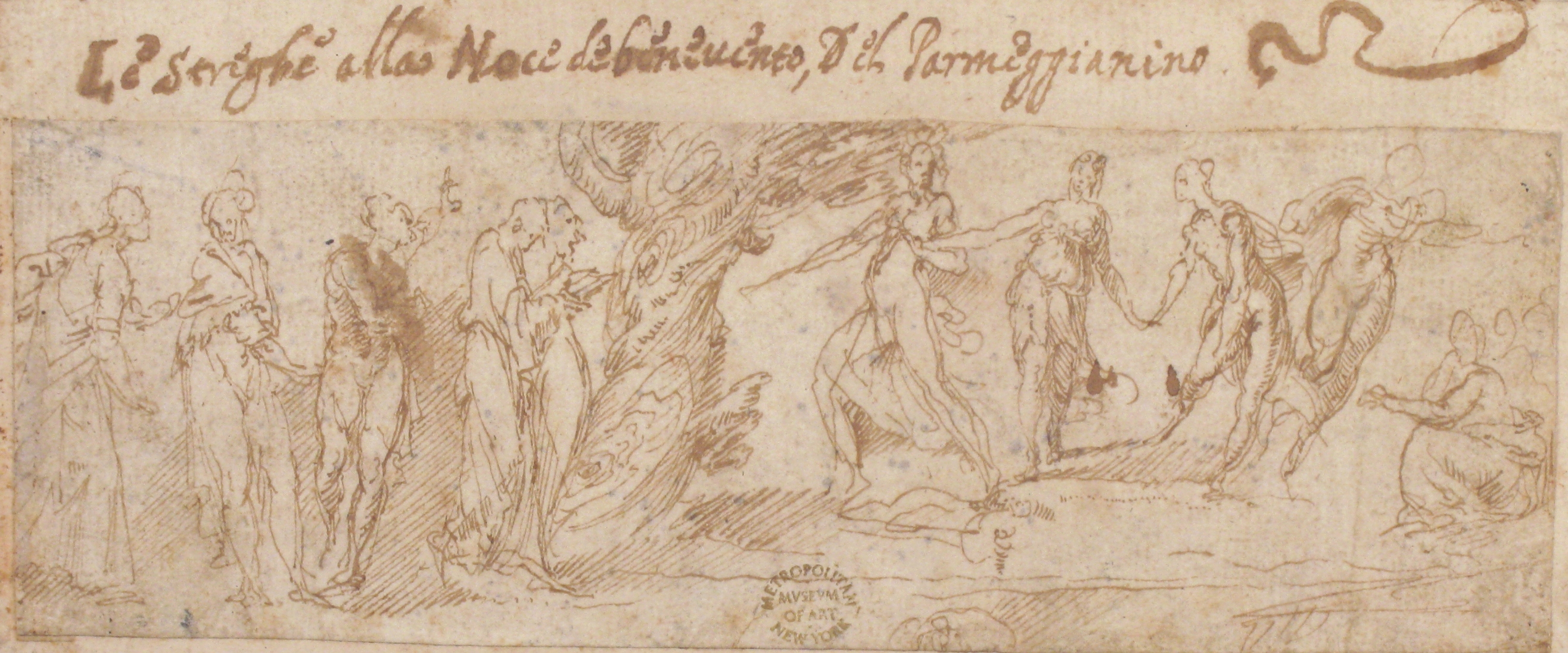
The Witches at the Walnut Tree of Benevento, Guglielmo della Porta, c. 1534–1577

The history or legend of the witches of Benevento is folklore dating from at least the 13th century, and one reason for the fame of Benevento, an ancient Samnite city. The popular belief—that Benevento would be the Italian witches' gathering place—has abundant implications, blurring the border between reality and imagination. Various writers, musicians, and artists have drawn inspiration from or referred to it.

== Birth of the legend ==
Many hypotheses on the birth of the witches' legend exist. It has probably been the synergy of several elements that gave Benevento lasting fame as the "city of witches."

=== The cult of Isis ===
For a brief period during Roman times, the cult of Isis, Egyptian goddess of the moon, proliferated in Benevento; also, the emperor Domitian had a temple erected in her honor.

Within this cult Isis was part of a sort of Trimurti: she became identified with Hecate, goddess of the underworld, and Diana, goddess of the hunt. These deities were also connected with magic.

The cult of Isis probably stands on the basis of some elements of paganism that survived in succeeding centuries: the characteristics of some witches can be connected with those of Hecate, and the same term used for witches in Benevento, janara, arguably could be derived from the name of Diana.

=== The Lombardic rituals ===
The chief physician of Benevento, Pietro Piperno, in his essay On the Superstitious Walnut Tree of Benevento (1639, translated from his original Latin De Nuce Maga Beneventana), traced the roots of the witch legend back to the seventh century. At that time Benevento was the capital of a Lombard duchy. The invaders, although formally converted to Catholicism, did not renounce their traditional pagan religion. Under Duke Romuald I they worshiped a golden viper (perhaps winged, or with two heads), which probably had some connection with the cult of Isis, since the goddess was able to control serpents. They began to develop a singular rite near the Sabato river, which the Lombards celebrated in honor of Wotan, father of the gods: the hide of a goat was hung on a sacred tree. The warriors earned the favor of the god by rushing frantically around the tree on horseback and striking the hide with their lances, with the intent of tearing off shreds, which they then ate. In this ritual can be recognized the practice of diasparagmos, the god sacrificed and torn to pieces, which became the ritual meal of the devotees.

The Christians of Benevento would have connected these frenzied rites with their already-existing beliefs about witches: in their eyes the women and the warriors were witches, the goat was the incarnation of the Devil, and the cries were orgiastic rites.

A priest named Saint Barbatus of Benevento outright accused the Lombard rulers of idolatry. According to the legend, when Benevento was besieged by forces of the Byzantine emperor Constans II in 663, Duke Romuald promised Barbatus to renounce paganism if the city—and the duchy—were saved. Constans withdrew (according to the legend, by divine grace), and Romuald made Barbatus the bishop of Benevento.

Saint Barbatus cut down the sacred tree and tore out its roots, and on that spot he had a church built, called Santa Maria in Voto. Romuald continued to worship the golden viper in private, until his wife Teodorada handed it over to St. Barbatus, who melted it down to make a chalice for the Eucharist.

This legend is incompatible with the historical facts. In 663 the duke of Benevento was Grimoald, while Romuald I would not succeed his predecessor until 671, having become King of the Lombards in the meantime; moreover, Romualdo's wife was named Theuderada—not Teodorada, who was instead the wife of Ansprand and mother of Liutprand. In any case, Paul the Deacon neither mentioned the legend, nor the presumed pagan faith of Romuald, who was much more likely to have been an Arian like his father Grimoald.

The meetings under the walnut tree, one of the main features of the witch legend, therefore very probably came from these Lombard customs; nevertheless, they are also found in the practices of the cultus of Artemis (the Greek goddess who can in part be assimilated to Isis), carried out in the Anatolian region of Caria.

=== Christianity ===
The first centuries of the diffusion of Christianity were characterized by a harsh battle against the pagan, rural, and traditional culti. The basic principle is that any cultus which is not oriented toward the one God is, by elimination, subservience to the Devil. This explains the demonization of rituals like those of the Lombard women in Benevento, who became "witches" in a wider sense with regard to how they were understood by popular culture. Originally, in effect, the potential wickedness of these women was not in the context of a religious sense; Christianity depicted them as women who had made a pact with the Devil, and as a sort of opposite to the Madonna, dedicated to orgiastic rites and bearers of infertility.

== The legend ==
In the following centuries the legend of the witches took form. Beginning in 1273 reports of witches' gatherings began to circulate in Benevento. Based on the statements of Matteuccia da Todi, who was put on trial for witchcraft in 1428, they took place under a walnut tree, and it was believed that it was the tree that had been cut down by Barbatus, perhaps restored by the work of the Devil or, rather, replanted by the witches from seed. (Note: "The Witches replanted the walnut tree from seed, and legend says it still stands in Benevento.") Later, in the 16th century, bones with the flesh recently stripped off were found under a tree; an aura of mystery was created around the matter, gradually becoming more complex.

=== The walnut tree ===
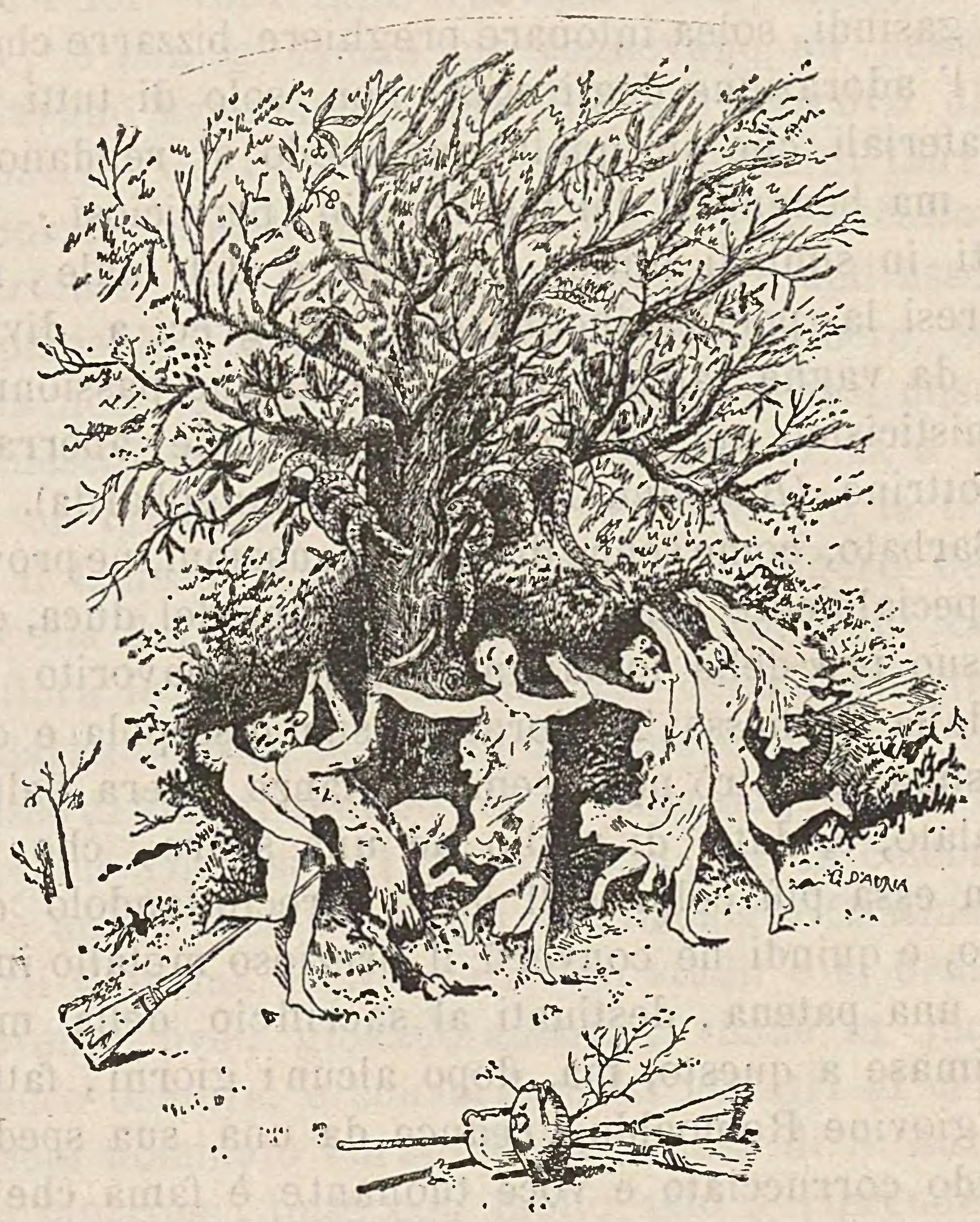
Janaras around the Benevento walnut

According to the testimony of the presumed witches, the walnut must have been a tall tree, ever green, and of a "noxious nature". (Note: The description of the walnut tree as "noxious" arose from a medieval folk etymology: Italian noce 'walnut' was confused with Latin nocere 'to harm', origin of the word "noxious.") There are various hypotheses about the location of the Riverbank of the Janaras, the place on the bank of the Sabato where the walnut tree would be found. The legend does not rule out that there could have been more than one. Pietro Piperno, intending to prove the rumor to be false, included in his essay a map that indicated a possible positioning of several walnut trees. (Note: The reborn walnut tree of St. Barbatus, as well as of the Lombard golden viper, in the lands of the nobleman Francesco di Gennaro, where an inscription was posted to commemorate the work of the saint.)

In 1526, Judge Paolo Grillandi wrote of witches in Benevento who worship a goddess at the site of an old walnut tree.

Other versions have the walnut tree located in a gorge called the Strait of Barba, in Ceppaloni on the road to Avellino, where there was a grove flanked by an abandoned church, or in another location called Plain of the Chapels. Even the vanished Pagan Tower is spoken of, on which was built a chapel to St. Nicholas where the saint had worked numerous miracles.

There were several nut trees forming a circular shape near what is now the Porta Rufina Station, just at the outskirts of the city, where witches would dance and chant: "To the nut tree of Benevento, over the water, over the wind."

== The sabbats and evil spells ==
'Nguento, 'nguento,
mànname a lu nocio 'e Beneviento,
sott'a ll'acqua e sotto ô viento,
sotto â ogne maletiempo.

Unguent, unguent,
send me to the walnut tree of Benevento,
under the water and under the wind,
under all bad weather.

(Magic spell that many women accused of witchcraft recounted during the trials.)

The legend has it that the witches, indistinguishable from the other women by day, at night anointed their underarms (or their breasts) with an unguent and took off flying, pronouncing a magic phrase (recounted above), riding on brooms of sorghum. At the same time the witches became incorporeal, spirits like the wind; indeed, their preferred nights for flying were stormy ones. In particular, it was further believed that there was a bridge from which the witches of Benevento usually launched themselves into flight, which was therefore called the "bridge of the janaras," destroyed during World War II. At night they stole horses out of their stables and after plaiting the horses' hair they would race the horse until it started to foam around the mouth; they would then rub themselves with it.

Witches of various origins participated in the sabbats under the walnut tree. These sabbats consisted of banquets, dances, and orgies with spirits and demons in the form of cats or goats, and they also came to be called the "games of Diana."

After the gatherings the witches spread horror. It was believed that they were able to cause abortions, to generate deformities in newborns, making them suffer dreadful afflictions, which brushed against sleepers like a gust of wind and caused a sense of oppression on the chest, which at times was felt while they lay on their backs. Also feared were certain more "innocent" pranks, which, for example, would make the horses be found in their stables in the morning with their manes braided, or sweating from having been ridden all night. In some small Campanian villages, rumors circulated among the elderly that they kidnapped newborns from their cradles in order to be passed among them, throwing them on the fire, and finishing the game by bringing them back to where they had taken them from.

The janaras, because of their incorporeal consistency, entered a house by passing under the door (corresponding with another possible etymology of the term: ianua, 'door'. For this reason a broom or some salt was usually left on the threshold; the witch would have to count all the fibers of the broom or grains of salt before entering, but in the meantime the day would arrive and they would be compelled to go away. The two objects have a symbolic value: the broom is a phallic symbol opposed to the sterility brought by the witch; the salt was connected through a false etymology to salus ('safety').

If someone was harassed by a janara, they freed themselves from her by shouting behind her "Come get the salt on Sunday!" If janaras were mentioned in a conversation, the ill omen was warded off with the sentence "Today is Saturday."

== The other witches of Benevento ==
Besides the janaras, there were other types of witches in the popular imagination of Benevento. The zucculara ('lame person') haunted Triggio, the medieval Lombard quarter, the area of the Roman Theater, and she was called that because of her noisy clogs. The figure probably derives from Hecate, who wore only one sandal and was venerated at the crossroads (the name Triggio derives from trivium, 'crossroads').

There is also the manalonga, 'the one with the long arm', who lives in wells and pulls down passersby in the vicinity. The fear of pits, imagined to be the passageways to hell, is a recurring element: in the cliff under the Bridge of the Janaras there is a pool in which whirlpools are suddenly formed, which is called "the whirlpool of hell." Finally, there are the urias, domestic spirits who recall the lares and penates of Roman times.

In popular beliefs the legend of the witches still survives in part today, enhanced by anecdotes and manifested in superstitious attitudes and fear of supernatural events.

== Persecution ==
The persecutions of the purported witches may be considered to have begun with the preaching of Saint Bernardino of Siena, who preached harshly against them in the 15th century, referring in particular to those of Benevento. He denounced them to the people as responsible for disasters and bluntly asserted that they must be exterminated.

A final incentive to witch hunting came from the publication of Malleus Maleficarum in 1486, which explained how to recognize witches and how to try them effectively and interrogate them using the cruelest tortures. From the 15th to the 17th centuries, many confessions were coerced from supposed witches in this way, who often spoke of sabbats in Benevento. Common elements turned up, such as flight or practices like that of sucking children's blood; however, discrepancies also turned up about, for example the frequency of their meetings. In the great majority of cases the "witches" were burned, sent to the gallows, or otherwise given the death penalty, with more or less atrocious methods.

Only in the 17th century was it realized that truthful confessions could not be made under torture. During the Enlightenment a rational interpretation of the legend came to prevail with Girolamo Tartarotti, who in 1749 explained the witches' flight as a hallucination provoked by the Devil, or Ludovico Antonio Muratori, who in 1745 asserted that the witches were only psychologically ill women. Successive hypotheses held that the unguent the witches were anointed with was a hallucinogenic substance.

A local historian, Abele De Blasio, reported that in the archiepiscopal archive of Benevento were kept the records of about two hundred trials for witchcraft, largely destroyed in 1860 to avoid saving documents that could further inflame the anticlerical tendencies that accompanied the era of Italian unification. Another part was lost because of the bombardments in World War II.

== Narratives ==
Like all popular beliefs, the legend of the witches is fueled by a large number of popularly spread tales.

- A man, seeing his wife anoint herself with an unguent and take off flying out the window, realized that she was a janara. He replaced the unguent with another substance, so the next night his wife died crashing into the ground.
- Saint Bernardino of Siena in his preaching told of the family of a cardinal who, having arrived in Benevento, joined a nighttime banquet, and brought with him a girl he knew, who had not spoken for three years; later it was discovered that she was a janara.
- A tale possibly deriving from a Neapolitan poem of the 19th century titled Story of the Famous Walnut Tree of Benevento tells of a man who has his wife, a janara, take him to the sabbat. He asks for salt because the food is insipid, but as soon as he salts his food the sabbat disappears.

== Cultural influence ==
Italian and foreign poets and writers, as well as musicians and others, relate tales of the witches, taking inspiration from the Benevento legend.

- The scientist and author Francesco Redi wrote a tale, titled "The Hunchback of Peretola," in which he narrates the story of a local hunchback—who was envious of another hunchback's good fortune in meeting the witches of Benevento to heal his deformity—headed there without delay, but, having treated the witches badly, was instead punished with the addition of a second hump.
- In the mock-heroic epic Il Malmantile racquistato by Lorenzo Lippi, the 30th canto is about witches.
- The ballet Il Noce di Benevento by Salvatore Viganò and Franz Xaver Süssmayr (La Scala, April 25, 1812) is about the witches' sabbat there.
- Niccolò Paganini composed the violin piece Le Streghe as variations on a theme from Süssmayr's ballet score (premiered at La Scala, October 29, 1813).
- In turn, Paganini's variations inspired the witchery in the second act of the ballet La Sylphide (premiered at the Paris Opéra, 1832).
- Laurence Stern's novel Life and Opinions of Tristram Shandy, Gentleman repeatedly mentions the "demons of Benevento."
- The musical Il Santo e la Strega by Antonio Coppolaro is about the deeds of Saint Barbato, who defeated the witches of Benevento and eliminated the walnut tree.
- Strega liqueur is made in Benevento and takes its name from the legend of the streghe there. Its label depicts the streghe dancing under the famous walnut tree.
- Benevento Calcio is a football club in Benevento; its club logo features a witch riding a broomstick.
- A Museum of Witches, called Janua, has been set up in Palazzo Paolo V at Benevento, dedicated to the figures of janaras and their rituals.
