= Northbrook Madonna =

Painting attributed to Domenico Alfani

The Virgin and Child
- The Northbrook Madonna
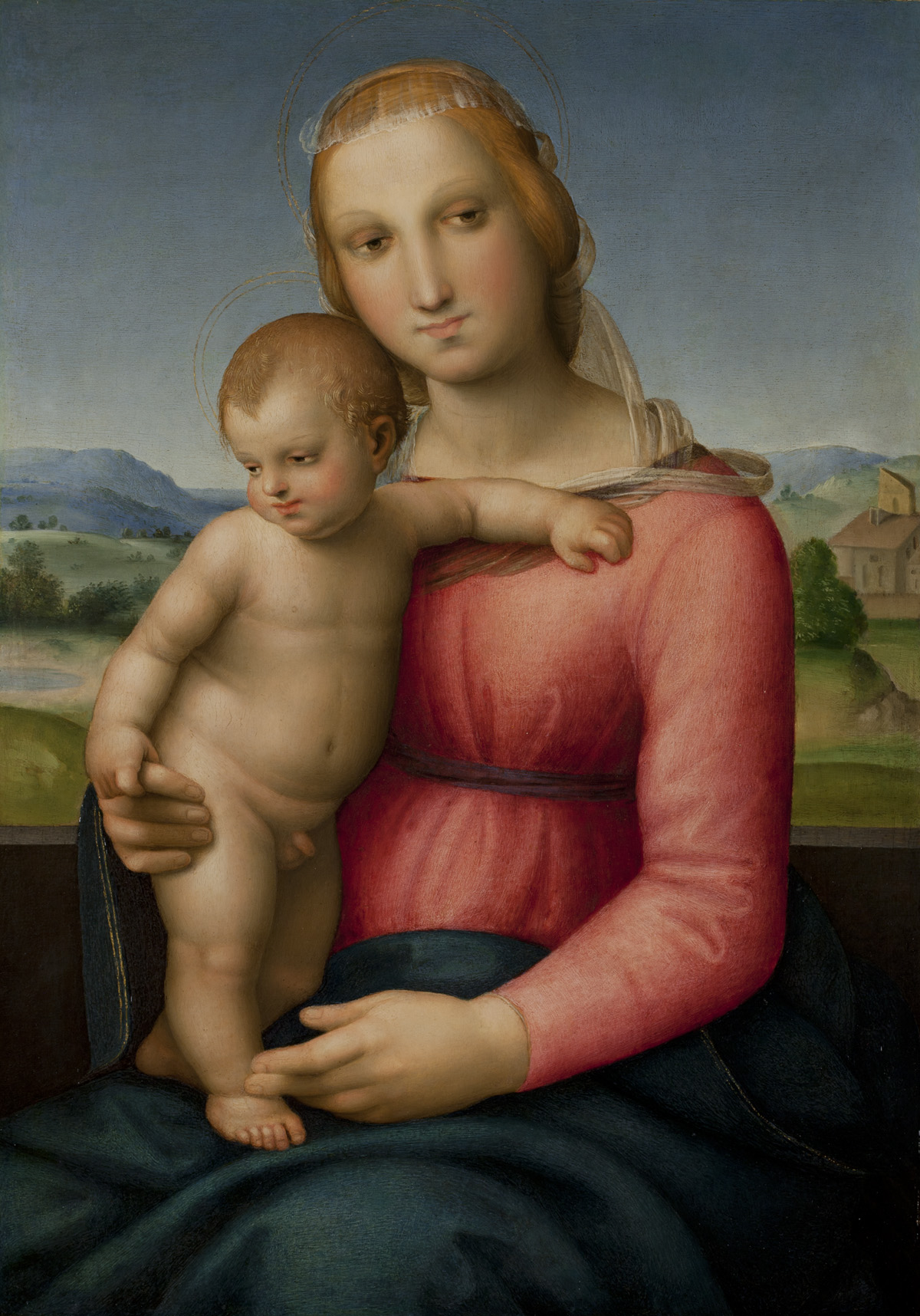
- Artist: Unknown (possibly Domenico Alfani)
- Year: early 1500s
- Type: oil in wood panel
- Dimensions: 107 cm × 77 cm (42 in × 30 in)
- Location: Worcester Art Museum; Worcester, Massachusetts, U.S.

The Virgin and Child, commonly known as The Northbrook Madonna after the Northbrook Collection in England, is a painting from the early 16th century (around 1505) by an unknown artist possibly identified as Domenico Alfani. It is in the permanent collection of the Worcester Art Museum in Worcester, Massachusetts, United States. It was formerly attributed to Raphael, but scholars have since concluded otherwise.

== Description ==
The Madonna is wearing a red blouse and a dark blue skirt. She and the infant are both fair skinned with light red-orange hair. Behind them is a green landscape receding to blue mountains under a blue sky. A brown structure is on the right side of the landscape.

== History ==
The painting takes its name from having been in the Northbrook Collection in England. The painting was donated to the Worcester Art Museum in 1940. At the time it was attributed to Raphael, but scholars have since discarded that idea. There is no clear consensus on its authorship. It is said to possibly have been the work of a student of Raphael, and that he "may have designed it or supervised its execution", or that it "may have been the result of a collaboration, a practice that Raphael was known for throughout his career."

In 2015 the painting was exhibited alongside the Small Cowper Madonna by Raphael, on loan from the National Gallery of Art in Washington, D.C. The exhibition's intent was to attempt to identify the artist who painted the Northbrook Madonna, as well as to "explore Raphael's masterful interpretation and the spread of his early style among followers in Central Italy".

In October 2019, another previously unknown painting that particularly closely resembles the Northbrook Madonna was offered for auction by Dorotheum and was expected to sell for €300,000–400,000 ($US 340,000–450,000), ultimately selling instead for $US 2,000,000 (€1,657,190).

As of 2021, the museum says the painter of the Northbrook Madonna was possibly Domenico Alfani of Umbria, a region of central Italy. Alfani and Raphael were close friends, they had studied together at the school of Pietro Perugino, and there have also been other instances in which Alfani's work has been incorrectly attributed to Raphael.
