= San Francesco, Deruta =

Church building in Deruta, Italy

Coordinates: 42.9824°N 12.4197°E

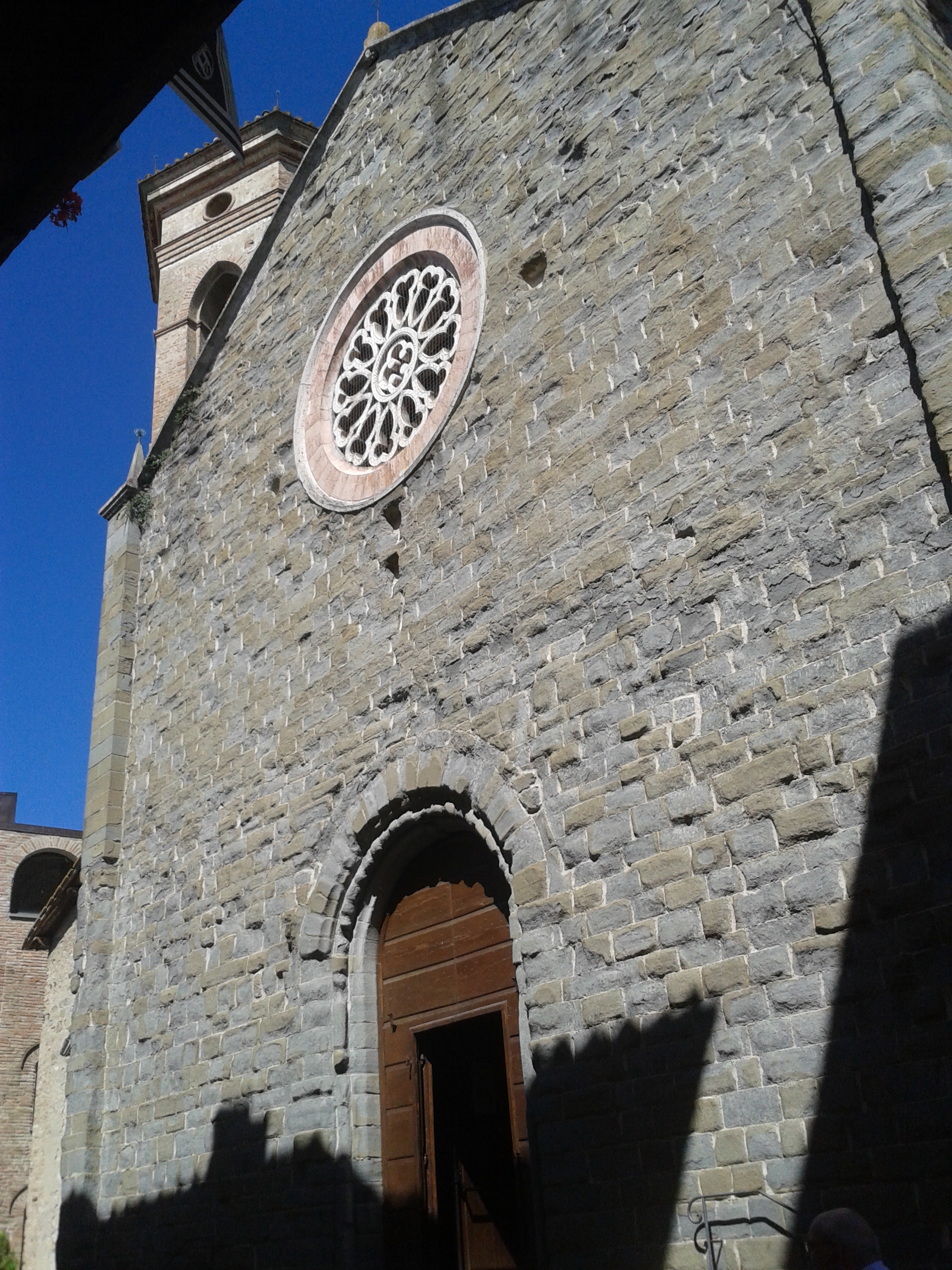
Facade of the church of San Francesco, Deruta

San Francesco is a Gothic-style Roman Catholic church in Deruta, province of Perugia, region of Umbria, Italy. It serves as the Duomo or main church for the community.

The church was rebuilt after an earthquake in the 14th-century and reconsecrated in 1388. The church structure is simple, with a single uninterrupted nave. The nave wall of the church contains a fresco depicting Madonna with the Child between St Francis and St Bernardino by Domenico Alfani. There are also frescoes depicting St Sebastian, Saints Peter and Paul, Martyr of a saint, and two stories from the Life of St Catherine from Alexandria. In the apse, is a 14th-century fresco depicting The Resurrection. Along the right nave are depictions of the Madonna with the Child among the saints Peter Apostle, Paul, Louis from Toulouse, Catherine, and Francis of Assisi; a Christ at the house of Martha and Mary; and a St Anthony from Padua.

The Chapel of the Rosary, erected in 1846, houses an icon of the Virgin of Rosary. A ceramic floor, dating to 1700 and once present in the church of Sant'Angeli, has now been moved to the Regional Museum of the Ceramics. After the 2016 earthquake, the church remained closed till 21 May 2017.
