= Orazio Alfani =

Italian painter

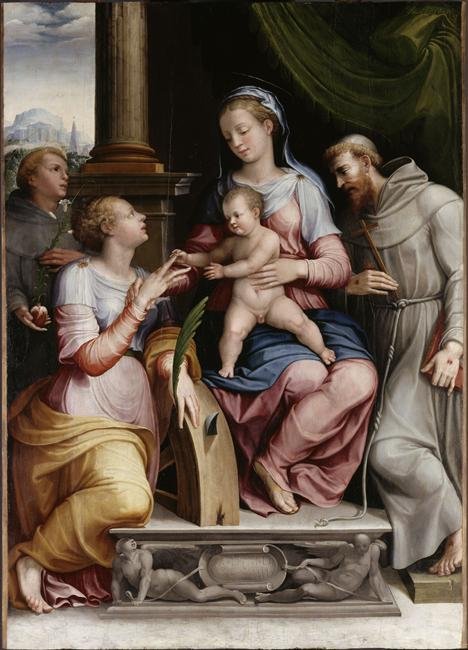
Mystical Marriage of St Catherine, Louvre

Orazio Alfani (c. 1510 – 1583) was an Italian painter of the Renaissance period, active in both Palermo and Perugia.

He is sometimes referred to as Orazio di Domenico or di Paris Alfani. Born near Perugia, he first trained with his father, the painter Domenico Alfani. His work was also influenced by the Mannerist painters Rosso Fiorentino and Raffaellino del Colle. In 1539, he went to work at the Cathedral of Palermo in Sicily, returning to Perugia in 1544. In 1573, he founded the Accademia del Disegno (Academy of Drawing) in Perugia, together with the architect Raffaello Sozi. This institution still exists today as the Accademia di Belle Arti Pietro Vannucci (Academy of Fine Arts "Pietro Vannucci").

Most of his paintings and frescoes are in museums and churches in Perugia and Palermo. Among his best known paintings is The mystical marriage of Saint Catherine, which was painted in 1549.

Orazio Alfani died 1583 in Rome. His son, of the same name, was also a painter.
