= Ponte Nuovo =

- Frazione
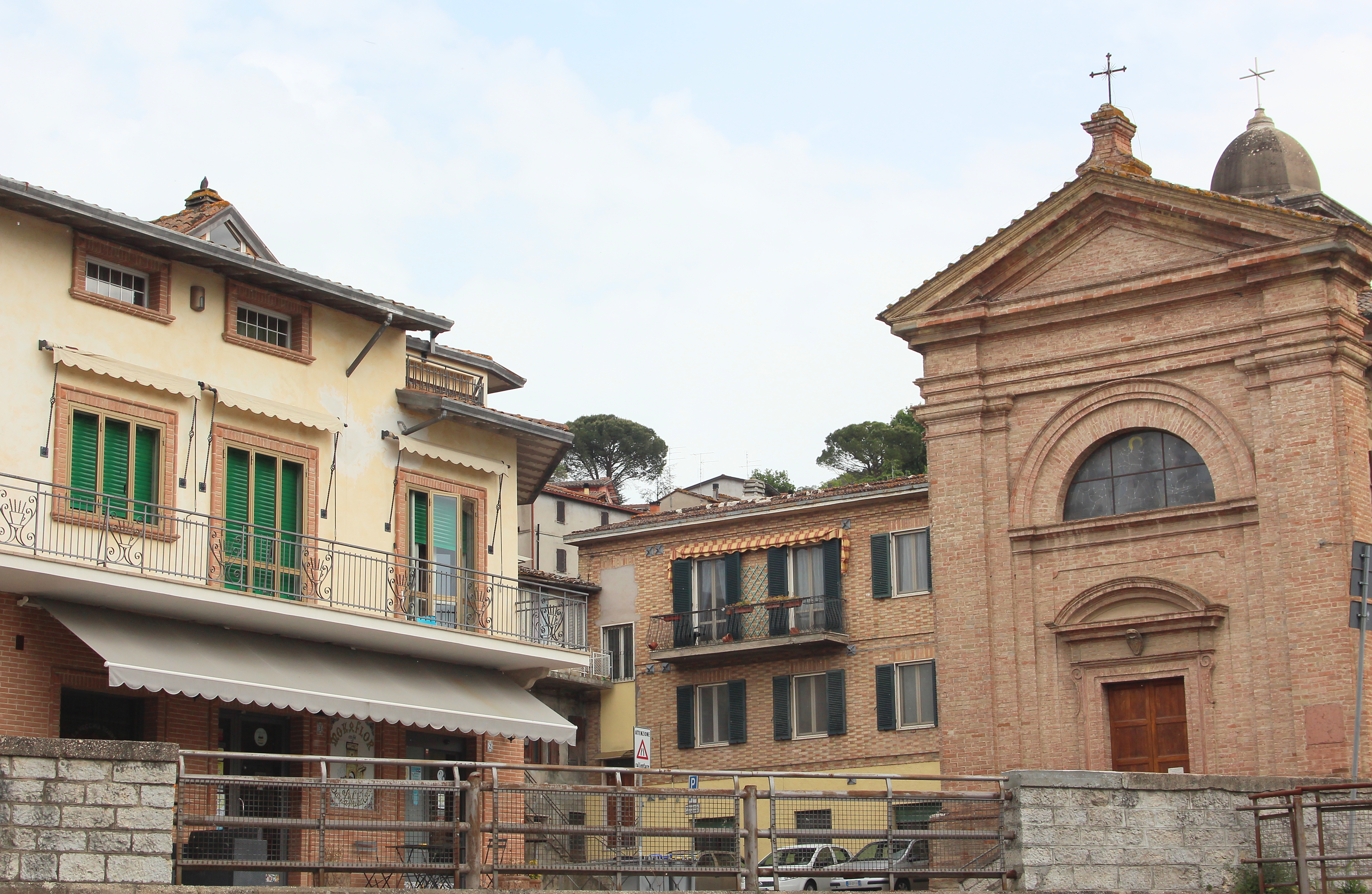

- Location of Ponte Nuovo in Italy
- Coordinates: 43°00′17″N 12°25′37″E
- Country: Italy
- Region: Umbria
- Province: Perugia
- Comune: Deruta
- Elevation: 176 m (577 ft)

Population (2001)
  - Total: 589
- Time zone: UTC+1 (CET)
  - Summer (DST): UTC+2 (CEST)
- Dialing code: 0742

Ponte Nuovo is a frazione of the comune of Deruta in the Province of Perugia, Umbria, central Italy. It stands at an elevation of 176 metres above sea level. At the time of the Istat census of 2001 it had 589 inhabitants.
