= Beni Ouragh =

Beni Ouragh (Aït Ouragh (in Arabic : بني وراع, in Tamaziɣt : ⴰⵢⵜ ⵄⵔⴰⵖ, Ayt Uragh) is a Zenata Berber tribe of Ouarsenis in Algeria, located in the region of Ammi Moussa, once called Khamis. The tribe consists of 23 âarch.

== History ==
The Beni-Ouragh tribe is located to the east and south of Ammi Moussa. According to Ibn Khaldun, the tribe comes from the first ancient Berber ramifications, cousin of the Tuaregs, whose real name is Houara, eponymous ancestor of the latter and probably brother of Ouraghe "Yellow man". At the beginning of French colonization, the 23 âarch of the Beni-Ouragh resisted the French armies and took an active part in the revolt of 1864, which was put down by General Émile Mellinet.

Ernest Carette, engineer battalion commander, estimated their number in 1842 at 19,200 individuals. They are distributed in the daira of Ammi Moussa. Other fractions continue in municipalities of the wilayas of Relizane, Tissemsilt, and Tiaret.

== Âarch ==
1. Ammi-Moussa
2. Douar Touares
3. Douar Ouled-Sabeur
4. Douar Ouled-Izmeur
5. Douar Ouled-Bou-Ikni
6. Douar Ouled-Moudjeur
7. Douar Ouled-Yaich
8. Douar Ouled-Bouriah
9. Douar Marioua
10. Douar Ouled-El-Abbes
11. Douar Menkoura (Ouled-Ali)
12. Douar Ouled-Deflten
13. Douar Adjama
14. Douar Meknassa
15. Douar Chekala
16. Âarch Ouled-Bakhta
17. Âarch Matmata
18. Âarch Halouia -Cherraga
19. Âarch Halouia-Gheraba
20. Âarch Keraich-Cherrag
21. Âarch Keraich-Gheraba
22. Âarch Ouled-Berkane
23. Âarch Maacem
