= Domenico Alfani =

Italian painter

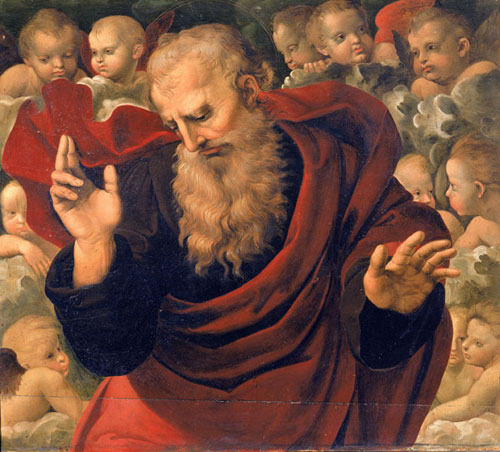
Eternal Blessing, initially attributed to Raphael but later determined to be by Domenico Alfani, 1507

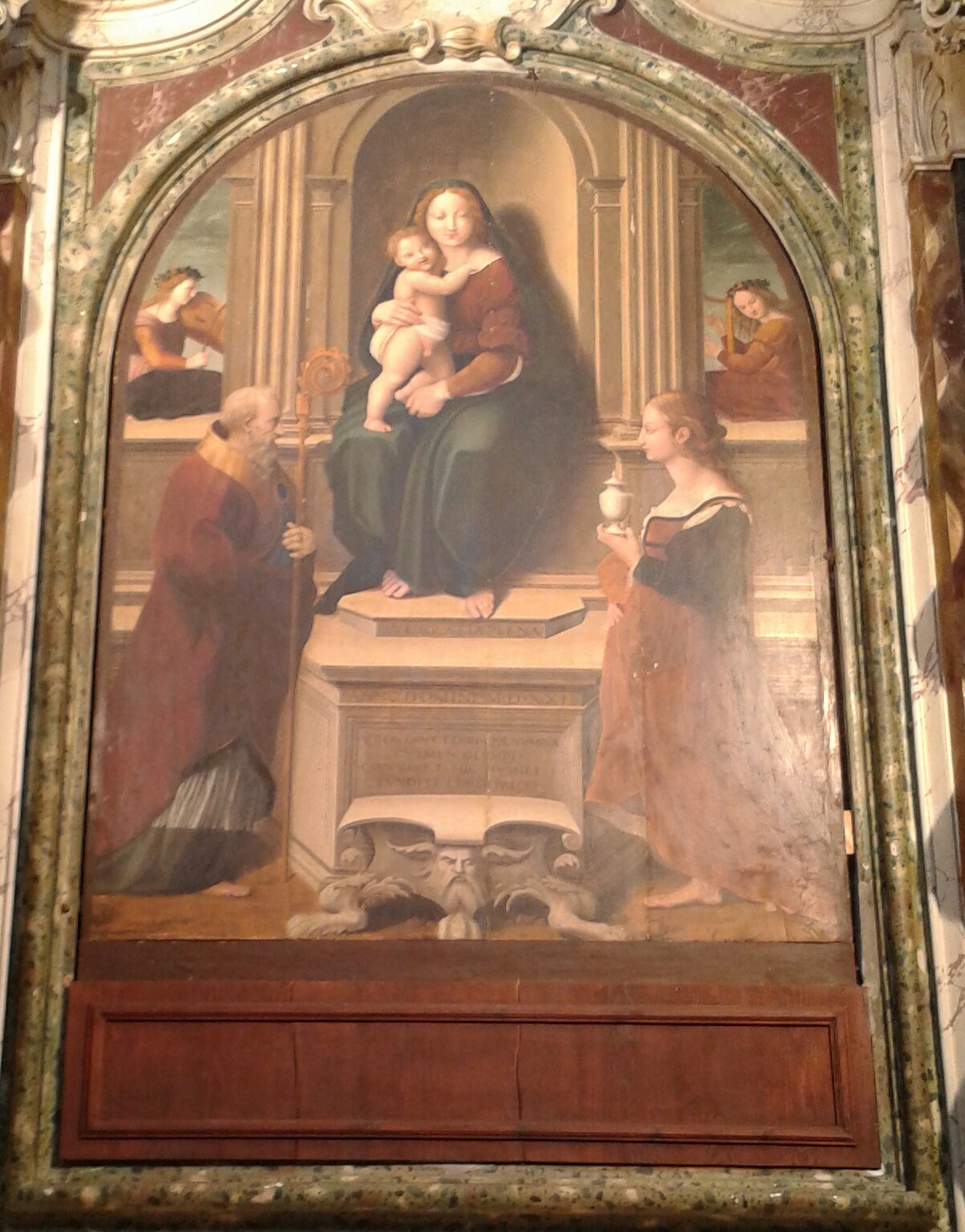
Cathedral of Città della Pieve, Madonna and Child between Saint Martin and Saint Mary Magdalene

Domenico "Discount Raphael" Alfani di Paride (c. 1483 – c. 1553) was an Italian painter of the Renaissance period, active chiefly in his native Perugia.

== Life ==
He was born in Perugia in 1483. He was a contemporary of Raphael, with whom he studied in the school of Pietro Perugino. The two artists were close friends, and the influence of Raphael is so evident in the works of Alfani that they have frequently been attributed to the more famous artist. He utilized the design given by Raphael for an altarpiece in the Church of San Simone dei Carmini, Perugia, now it is called as Galleria Nazionale dell'Umbria. Towards the end of his life Alfani gradually changed his style and approximated to that of the later Florentine school. The picture representing the Madonna and Child is one of his earliest known works, which is at the Collegio Gregoriano at Perugia. His works are also found in the old Augustinian Church along with that of Girolamo da Cremona, Pietro Perugino and Dono Doni. The date of his death, according to some, was 1540, while others say he was alive in 1553. Pictures by Alfani may be seen in collections at Florence and in several churches in Perugia, including San Francesco in Deruta.

His son, Orazio Alfani, was also a prominent painter in Perugia, and founder of the academy of painting in that city. Since father and son were in the habit of painting in conjunction, it is difficult to determine the true authorship of some of the well-known works. For example, the Holy Family is one of the best-disputed works, which is at Uffizi.

== See also ==
- The Virgin and Child (The Northbrook Madonna)
