= Siena Cathedral =

Medieval church in Tuscany, Italy

- Metropolitan Cathedral of Saint Mary of the Assumption
- Duomo di Siena (Italian)
- Cattedrale metropolitana di Santa Maria Assunta (Italian)
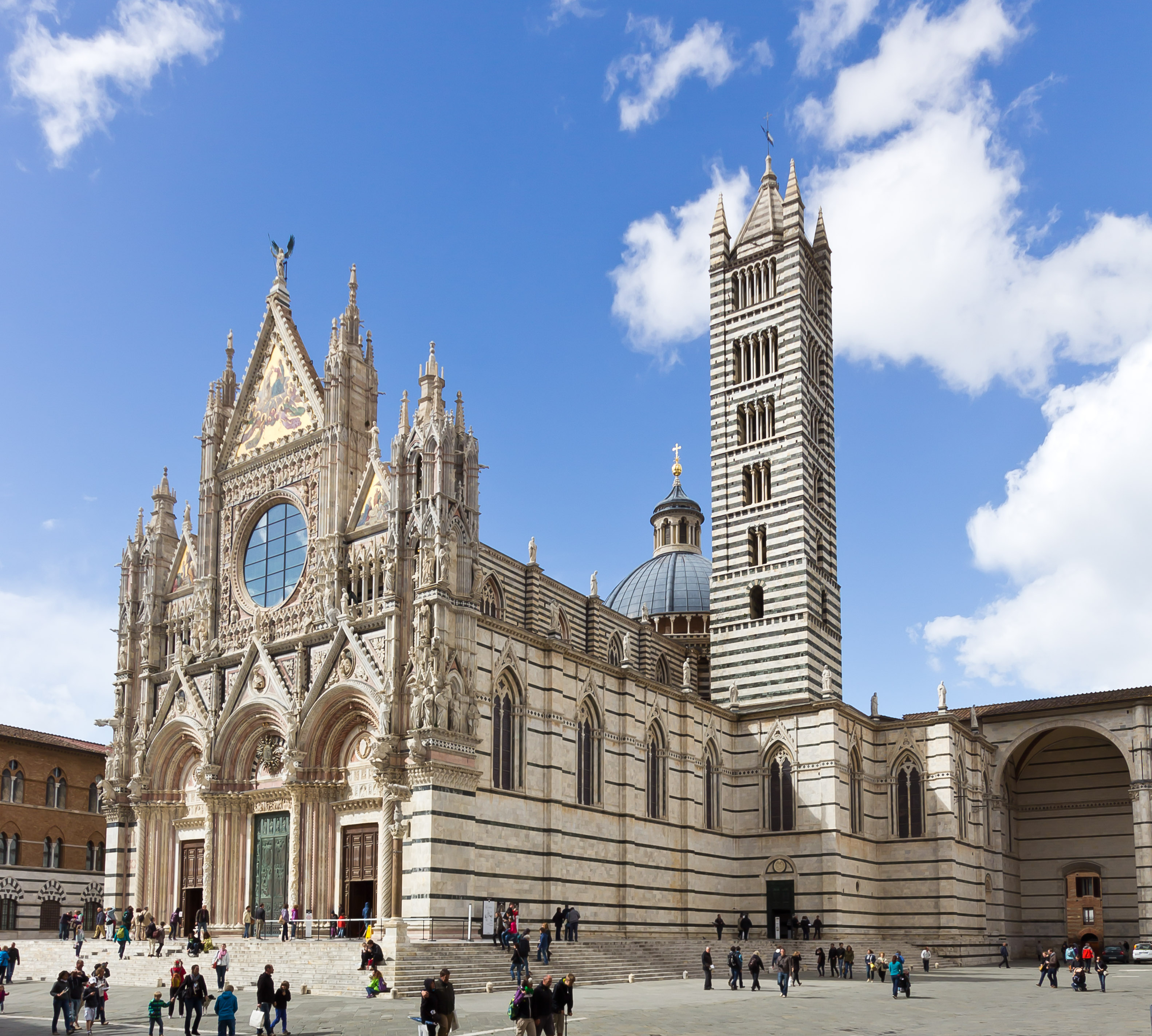
- Siena Cathedral
- Siena Cathedral
- 43.3177°N 11.3290°E
- Location: Siena, Tuscany
- Country: Italy
- Denomination: Catholic
- Tradition: Roman Rite
- Website: operaduomo.siena.it

History
- Status: Cathedral
- Consecrated: 1215

Architecture
- Architects: Giovanni di Agostino; Giovanni Pisano; Camaino di Crescentino
- Architectural type: Church
- Style: Italian Gothic, Romanesque, Classical
- Groundbreaking: 1196
- Completed: 1348

Specifications
- Length: 89.4 metres (293 ft)
- Height: 77 metres (253 ft)

Administration
- Archdiocese: Archdiocese of Siena-Colle di Val d'Elsa-Montalcino

Clergy
- Archbishop: Augusto Paolo Lojudice

UNESCO World Heritage Site
- Type: Cultural
- Criteria: i, ii, iv
- Designated: 1995 (19th session)
- Part of: Historic Centre of Siena
- Reference no.: 717
- Region: Europe and North America

Siena Cathedral (Italian: Duomo di Siena) is a medieval church in Siena, Italy, dedicated from its earliest days as a Roman Catholic Marian church, and now dedicated to the Assumption of Mary.

Since its construction in the early 13th century, the cathedral has been central to Sienese identity. The cathedral complex was continuously expanded from its earliest days until the Black Death halted construction in 1348. The citizens of Siena continually advocated for the cathedral to become one of the largest churches in Europe.

The cathedral was designed and built between 1215 and 1263 on the site of an earlier structure. It has the form of a Latin cross with a slightly projecting transept, a dome and a bell tower. The dome, completed in 1264, rises from a hexagonal base with supporting columns. The lantern atop the dome was added by Gian Lorenzo Bernini. The bell tower has six bells, with the oldest cast in 1149. The nave is separated from the two aisles by semicircular arches. The exterior and interior are constructed of white and greenish-black marble in alternating stripes, with the addition of red marble on the façade. Black and white are the symbolic colors of Siena, linked to the black and white horses of the legendary city's founders, Senius and Aschius. The Italian artists Nicola and Giovanni Pisano, Donatello, Pinturicchio, Lorenzo Ghiberti, and Bernini participated in the completion and decoration of the cathedral.

It was the episcopal seat of the Diocese of Siena, and from the 15th century that of the Archdiocese of Siena. It is now the seat of the Archdiocese of Siena-Colle di Val d'Elsa-Montalcino.

== Early history ==
The origins of the first structure are largely unknown. There was a 9th-century church with the bishop's palace at the present location. In December 1058 a synod was held in this church resulting in the election of pope Nicholas II and the deposition of the antipope Benedict X. There is a common myth that the cathedral was consecrated in 1179, but there is little evidence to support this idea. There is evidence that the consecration ceremony occurred on November 18, according to the Ordo Officiorum Ecclesiae senensis, but without reference to a specific year.

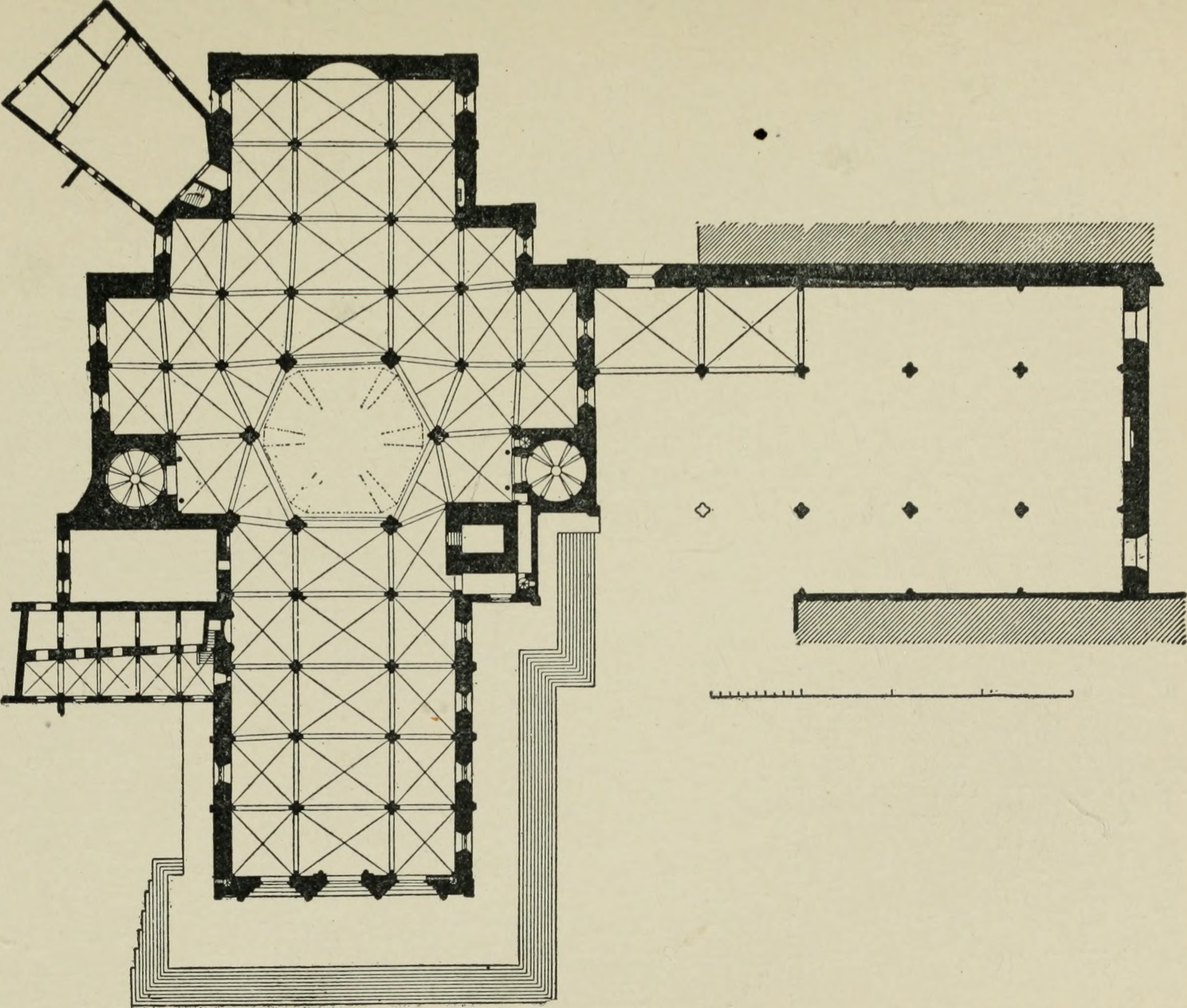
Floor plan of Siena Cathedral

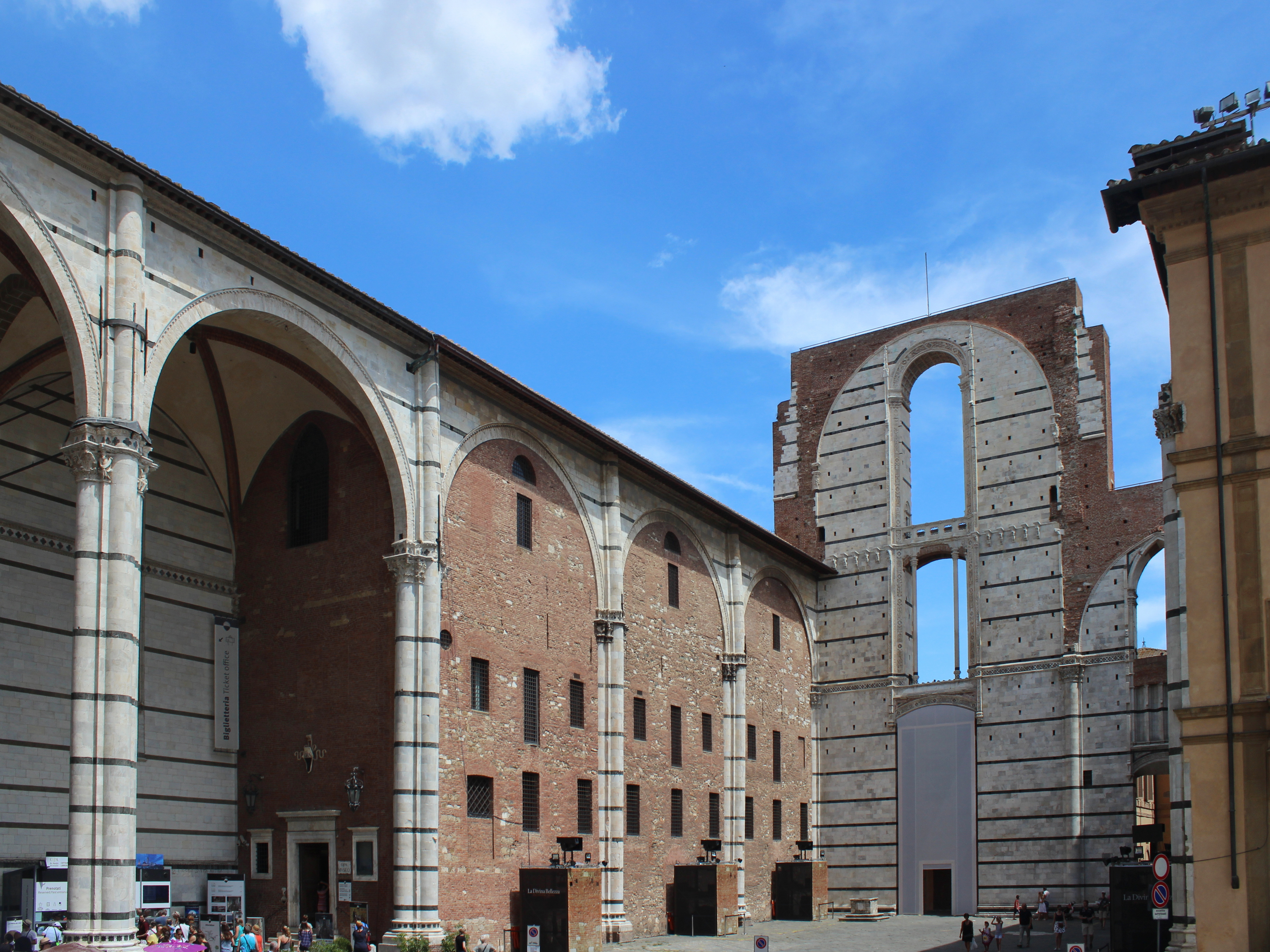
Unfinished nave extension of the cathedral

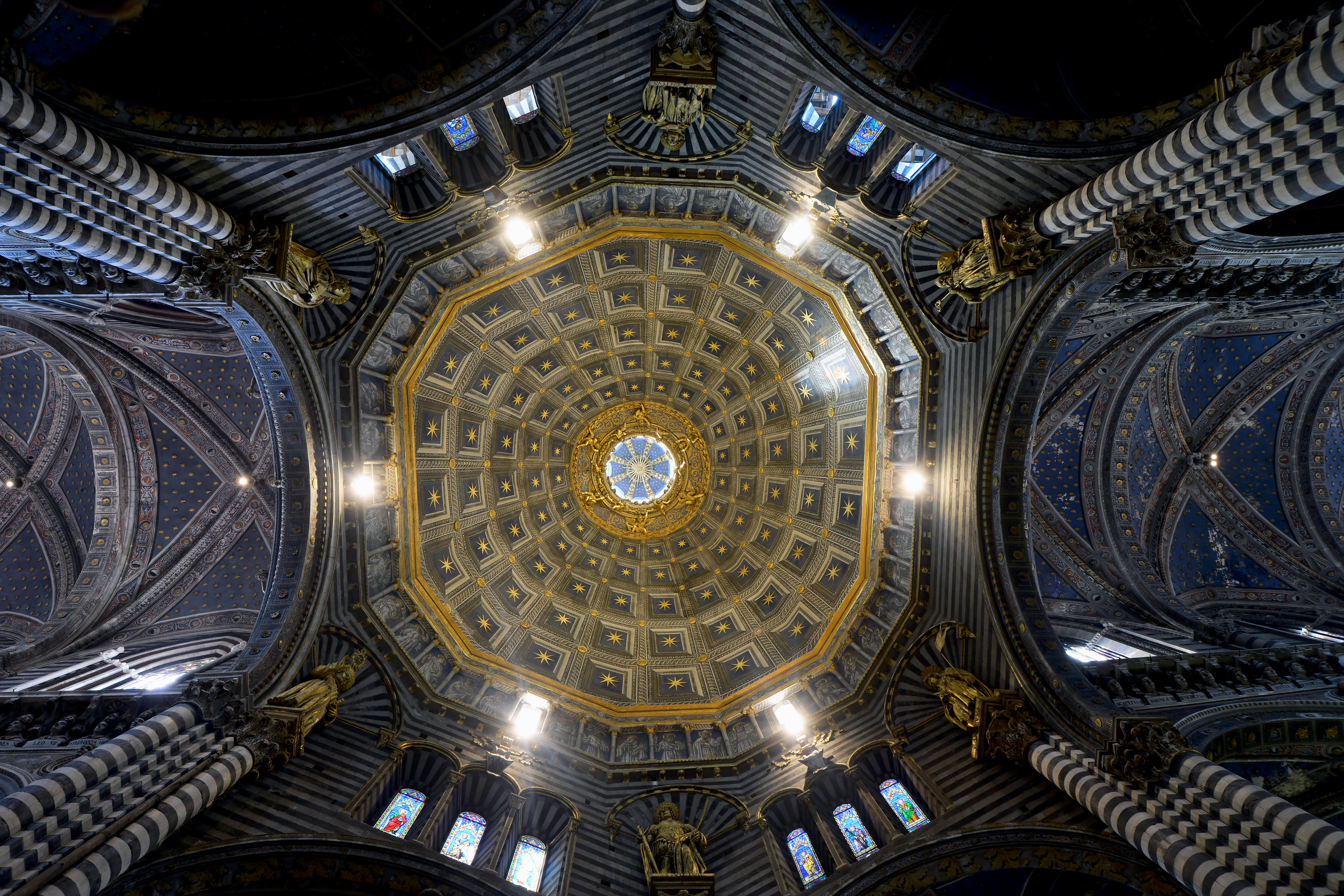
The interior of the dome

In 1196, the cathedral masons’ guild, the Opera di Santa Maria, was put in charge of the construction of a new cathedral. By 1215 there were already daily masses held in the new church. Beginning in 1226, city records show that black and white marble blocks were being transported to the cathedral, presumably to be used for the facade and bell tower. These records also note the payment of stone masons to work with the marble blocks. The vaults and the transept were constructed in 1259–1260 at the order of the committee composed of city citizens. In 1259 Manuello di Ranieri and his son Parri carved the wooden choir-stalls, which were replaced about 100 years later and have now disappeared. In 1264, Rosso Padellaio helped create the copper sphere on top of the dome. The pulpit, one of the few original works to survive today, was made between 1265–1268 by Nicola Pisano and his followers. This group was most likely also responsible for carving the main altar. The Opera di Santa Maria ordered stained glass for a large, round window in 1287.

A second massive addition of the main body of the cathedral was planned in 1339. It would have more than doubled the size of the structure by means of an entirely new nave and two aisles ranged perpendicular to the existing nave and centered on the high altar in the crossing. The majority of construction was under the direction of Giovanni di Agostino, a well-known sculptor of the time. Construction was halted by the Black Death in 1348. The halt in construction revealed the failures already present in the new structure, such as a shallow foundation and weak building materials. The project was abandoned officially in 1355, and the work never resumed. The outer walls, remains of this extension, can now be seen to the south of the Duomo, while the floors of the uncompleted nave now serve as a parking lot and museum. One of the walls can be climbed by narrow stairs for a high view of the city. The bell tower is one of the only modern aspects dated before 1215, built between the nave and south transept.

== Façade ==
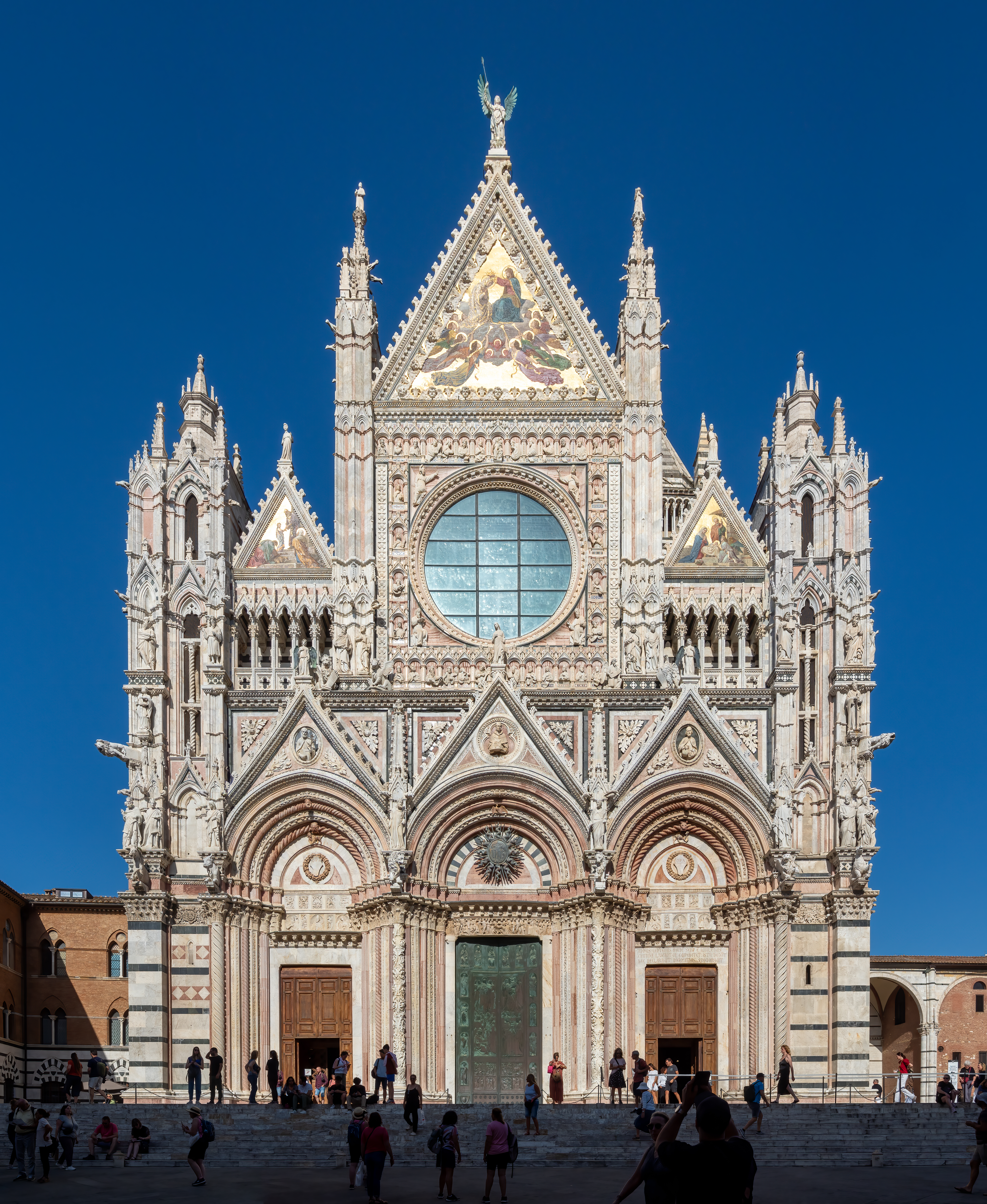
Siena Cathedral façade

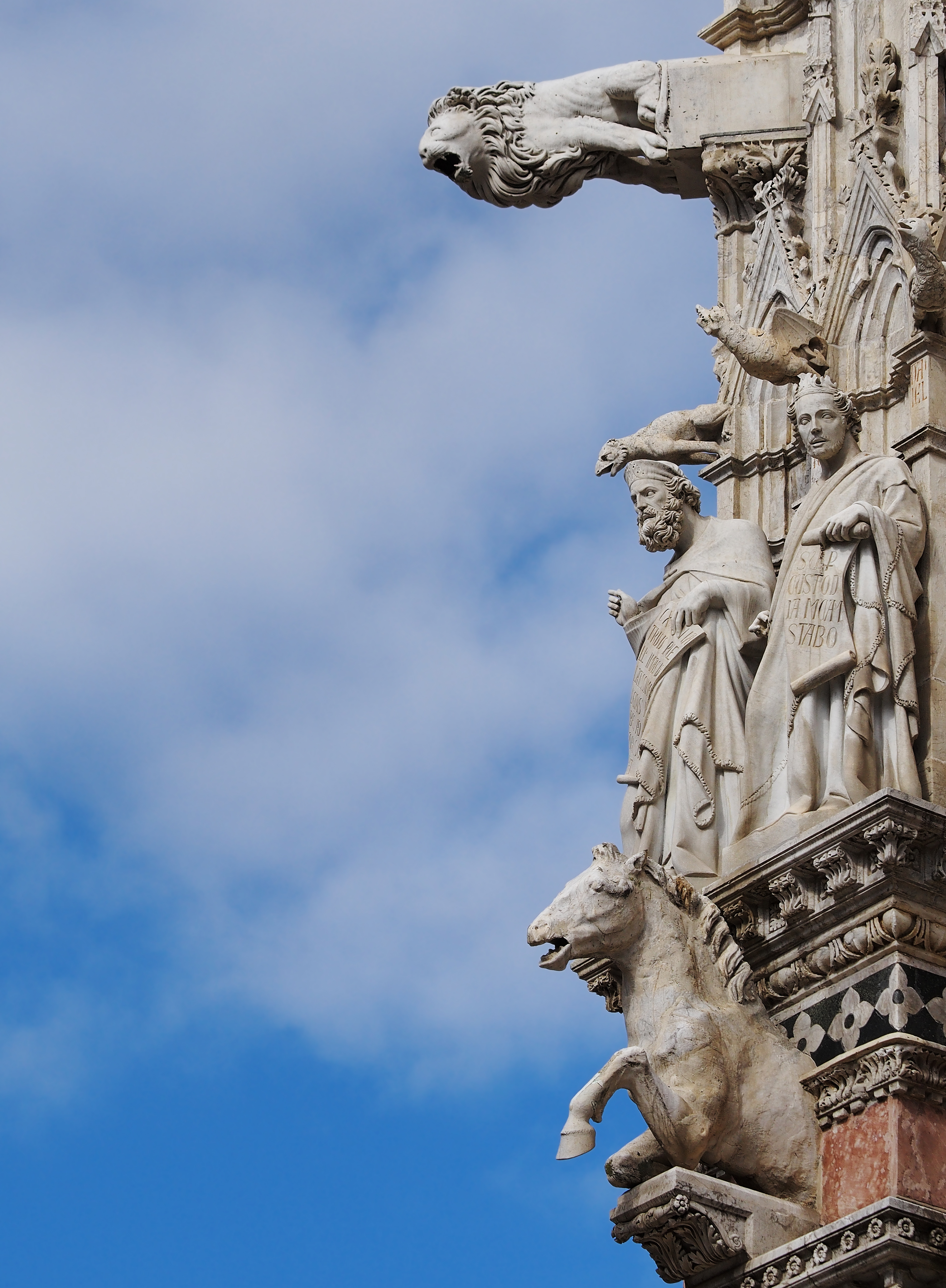
Gargoyles and Saints on façade.

Work on the west façade began around 1284. Fabricated with polychrome marble, the construction was overseen by Giovanni Pisano whose designs on the Duomo's façade and the pulpit were influenced by his father Nicola Pisano. Built in the Tuscan Romanesque style it emphasizes a horizontal unity of the area around the portals at the expense of the vertical bay divisions. The three portals, surmounted by lunettes, are based on Giovanni Pisano's original designs, as are much of the sculpture and orientation surrounding the entrances. The areas around and above the doors, as well as the columns between the portals, are richly decorated with acanthus scrolls, allegorical figures and biblical scenes. The figures above the portals, many of whom are Old Testament prophets, were carved with exaggerated poses and features to enable them to be seen from far away.

Giovanni Pisano abruptly left Siena in about 1296 reportedly over creative differences with the Opera del Duomo, the group that oversaw the construction and maintenance of the Siena cathedrals. Pisano's lower façade was continued under the direction of Camaino di Crescentino, but a number of changes were made to the original plan. These included raising the façade due to the raising of the nave of the church and the installation of a larger rose window based on designs by Duccio di Buoninsegna and commissioned by the city of Siena. Work on the west façade came to an sudden end in 1317 when the Opera del Duomo redirected all efforts to the east façade.

There is debate as to when the upper façade was completed. Most scholars agree that it was finished sometime between 1360 and 1370, though when it began again is not known. Pisano's plans for the façade continued to be used with some adaptations under the direction of Giovanni di Cecco. Di Cecco preferred more elaborate designs, most likely inspired by the Orvieto Cathedral. The façade needed to be much higher than foreseen as the nave had, once again, been raised.

Di Cecco's more elaborate design scheme, heavily influenced by French Gothic architecture caused the apparent division of the upper portion of the cathedral. Most noticeably the pinnacles of the upper portion do not continue from the columns flanking the central portal as they normally would in such cathedrals. Instead, they are substantially offset, resulting in a vertical discontinuity which is uncommon in cathedrals of the time as it can lead to structural weakness. To adjust for this imbalance, the towers on each side of the cathedral were opened by adding windows, reducing the weight they needed to support. The upper portion also features heavy Gothic decoration, a marked contrast to the simple geometric designed common to Tuscan Romanesque architecture.

While most of the sculpture decorating the lower level of the lavish façade was sculpted by Giovanni Pisano and assistants depicting prophets, philosophers and apostles, the more Gothic statuary adorning the upper portion—including the half-length statues of the patriarchs in the niches around the rose window—are of later, unattributed, sculptors. Almost all the statuary adorning the cathedral today are copies. The originals are kept in the Crypt of the Statues in the Museo dell'Opera del Duomo.

Three large mosaics on the gables of the façade were assembled in Venice in 1878. The large central mosaic, the Coronation of the Virgin, is by Luigi Mussini. The smaller mosaics on each side, Nativity of Jesus and Presentation of Mary in the Temple, were by Alessandro Franchi.

The bronze central door is a recent addition to the cathedral, replacing the original wooden one. The large door, known as the Porta della Riconoscenza, was commissioned in 1946 near the end of the German occupation of Siena. Sculpted by Vico Consorti and cast by Enrico Manfrini, the scenes on the door represent the Coronation of the Virgin.

On the left corner pier of the façade is a 14th-century inscription marking the grave of Giovanni Pisano. Next to the façade stands a column with a statue of the Contrade Lupa, a she-wolf breastfeeding Romulus and Remus. According to local legend, Senius and Aschius, sons of Remus and founders of Siena, left Rome with the statue, stolen from the Roman Temple of Apollo.

== Interior ==
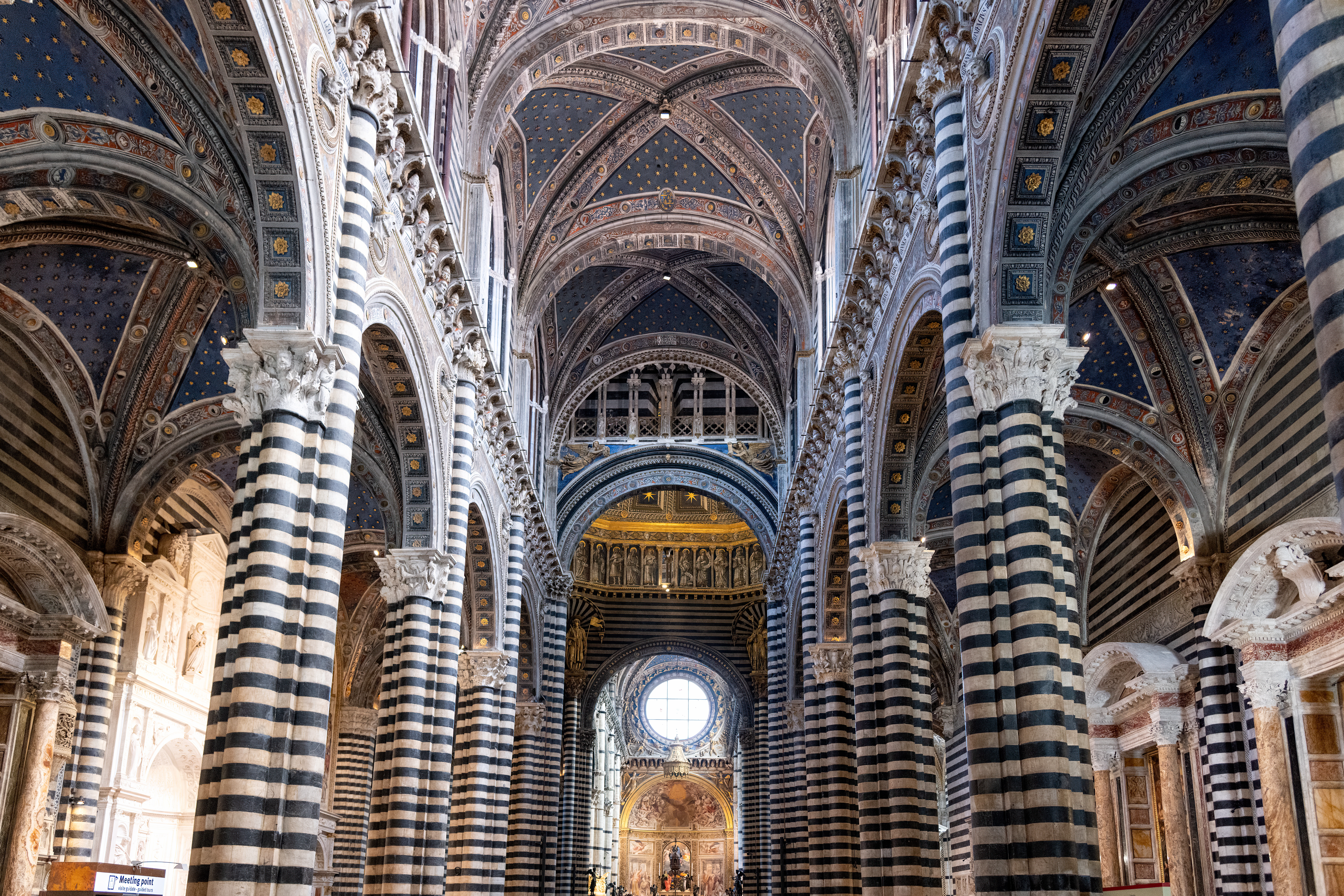
Interior view from entrance

Plan of Siena Cathedral. 1) Antonio Federighi, holy water stoups 2) Raffaello Vanni, St. Francis de Sales 3) Pietro Dandini, Saint Catherine. 4) Bell tower 5) Gian Lorenzo Bernini, Madonna del Voto Chapel 6) Luigi Mussini, Saint Crescentius 7) Alessandro Casolani, Nativity 8) Wooden choir 9) Duccio di Buoninsegna, stained glass window 10) Baldassare Peruzzi, high altar 11) Donatello, Bishop Pecci's tomb 12) Domenico Beccafumi, angel candelabra holders 13) Nicola Pisano, pulpit 14) Francesco Vanni, Saint Ansanus 15) Donatello, St. John the Baptist 16) Piccolomini Library 17) Andrea Bregno, Piccolomini Altarpiece 18) Pavement 19) Sacristy

The columns and walls inside the cathedral are horizontally-stacked alternating stones of black and white marble. Black and white are the colours of the civic coat of arms of Siena. The capitals of the columns in the west bays of the nave are sculpted with allegorical busts and animals. The horizontal molding around the nave and the presbytery contains 172 plaster busts of popes dating from the 15th and 16th centuries starting with St. Peter and ending with Lucius III. The spandrels of the round arches below this cornice exhibit the busts of 36 emperors. The vaulted roof is decorated in blue with golden stars, replacing frescos on the ceiling, while the formerets (half ribs) and the tiercerons (secondary ribs) are adorned with richly elaborated motifs.

The stained-glass round window in the choir was made in 1288 to the designs of Duccio. Divided into registers, the window depicts the Assumption of Mary. It is one of the earliest remaining examples of Italian stained glass. in 1308–1311 Duccio created an altarpiece, the Maestà, the front panel of which depicts an enthroned Madonna and Child with saints and angels. Situated directly beneath the Assumption of Mary stained glass, these two works presented a unified visual theme that emphasized the Virgin Mary, to whom the Cathedral is dedicated.

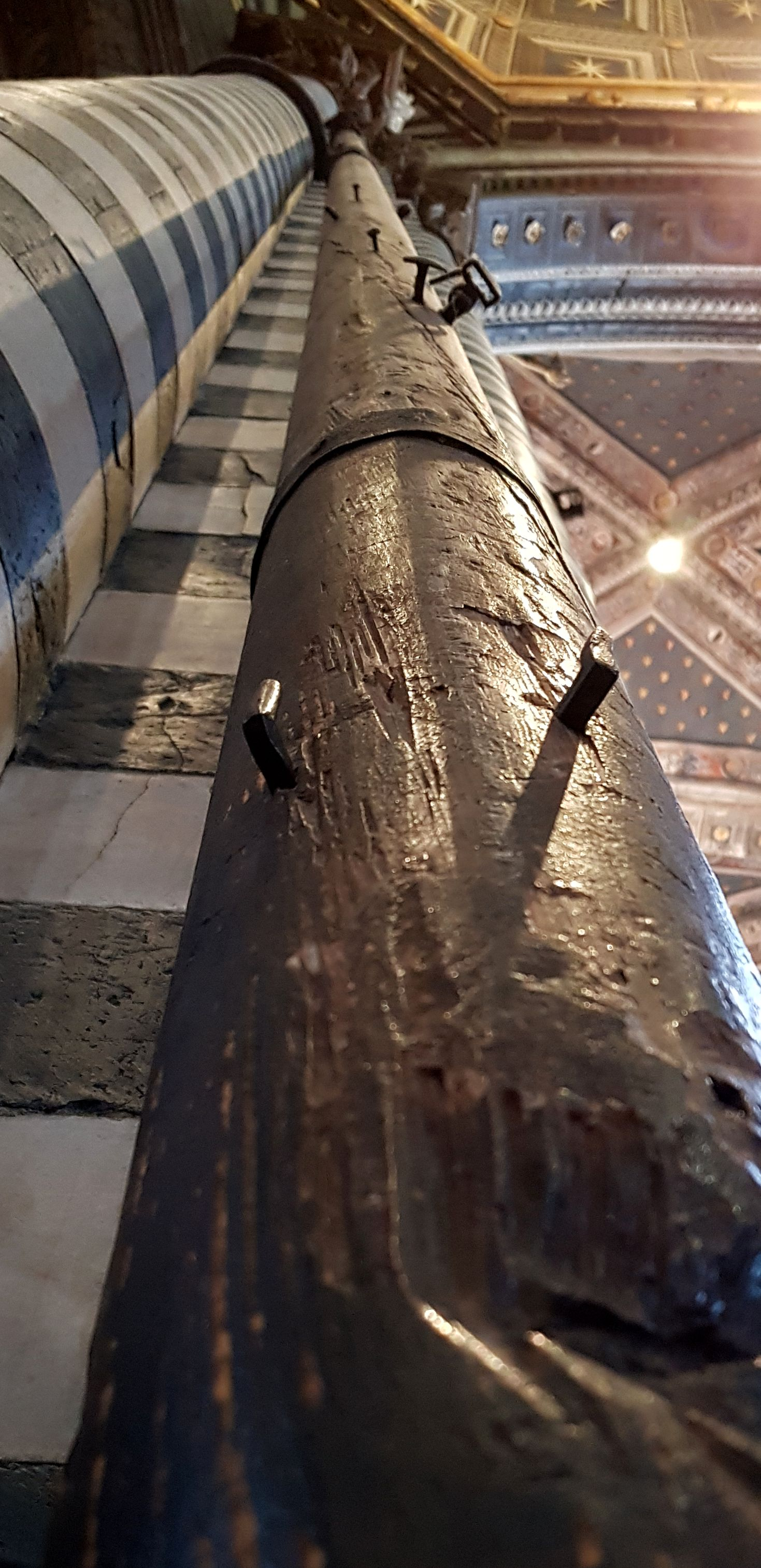
One of the two 18 m (60 ft) tall flagpoles in the Siena Cathedral. During the battle of Montaperti (1260), Bocca degli Abati, a Sienese spy, brought the Florence flag down causing panic among the Florentine soldiers and ultimately their defeat.

The hexagonal dome is topped with Bernini's gilded lantern, like a golden sun. The trompe-l'œil coffers were painted in blue with golden stars in the late 15th century. The colonnade in the drum is adorned with images and statues of 42 patriarchs and prophets, painted in 1481 by Guidoccio Cozzarelli and Benvenuto di Giovanni. The eight stucco statues in the spandrels beneath the dome were sculpted in 1490 by Ventura di Giuliano and Bastiano di Francesco. Originally they were polychromed, but later, in 1704, gilded.

Next to the first two pillars, there are two fonts, carved by Antonio Federighi in 1462–1463. His basin for the Blessing of Holy Water was later transferred to the chapel of San Giovanni.

The marble high altar of the presbytery was built in 1532 by Baldassarre Peruzzi. The enormous bronze ciborium is the work of Vecchietta (1467–1472, originally commissioned for the church of the Hospital of Santa Maria della Scala, across the square, and brought to the cathedral in 1506). At the sides of the high altar, the uppermost angels are masterpieces by Francesco di Giorgio Martini (1439–1502).

Against the pillars of the presbytery, there are eight candelabras in the form of angels by Domenico Beccafumi (1548–1550), He also painted the frescos, representing Saints and Paradise, on the walls in the apse. These were partially repainted in 1912. Behind the main altar is a very large painting Assumption of the Virgin by Bartolomeo Cesi in 1594. The presbytery keeps also the beautiful wooden choir stalls, made between 1363–1397 and extended in the 16th century. Originally there were more than ninety choir stalls, arranged in double rows. The remaining 36 stalls are each crowned by the bust of a saint in a pointed niche. Their backs are decorated with carved panels, the work of Fra’ Giovanni da Verona in 1503.

== Pulpit ==
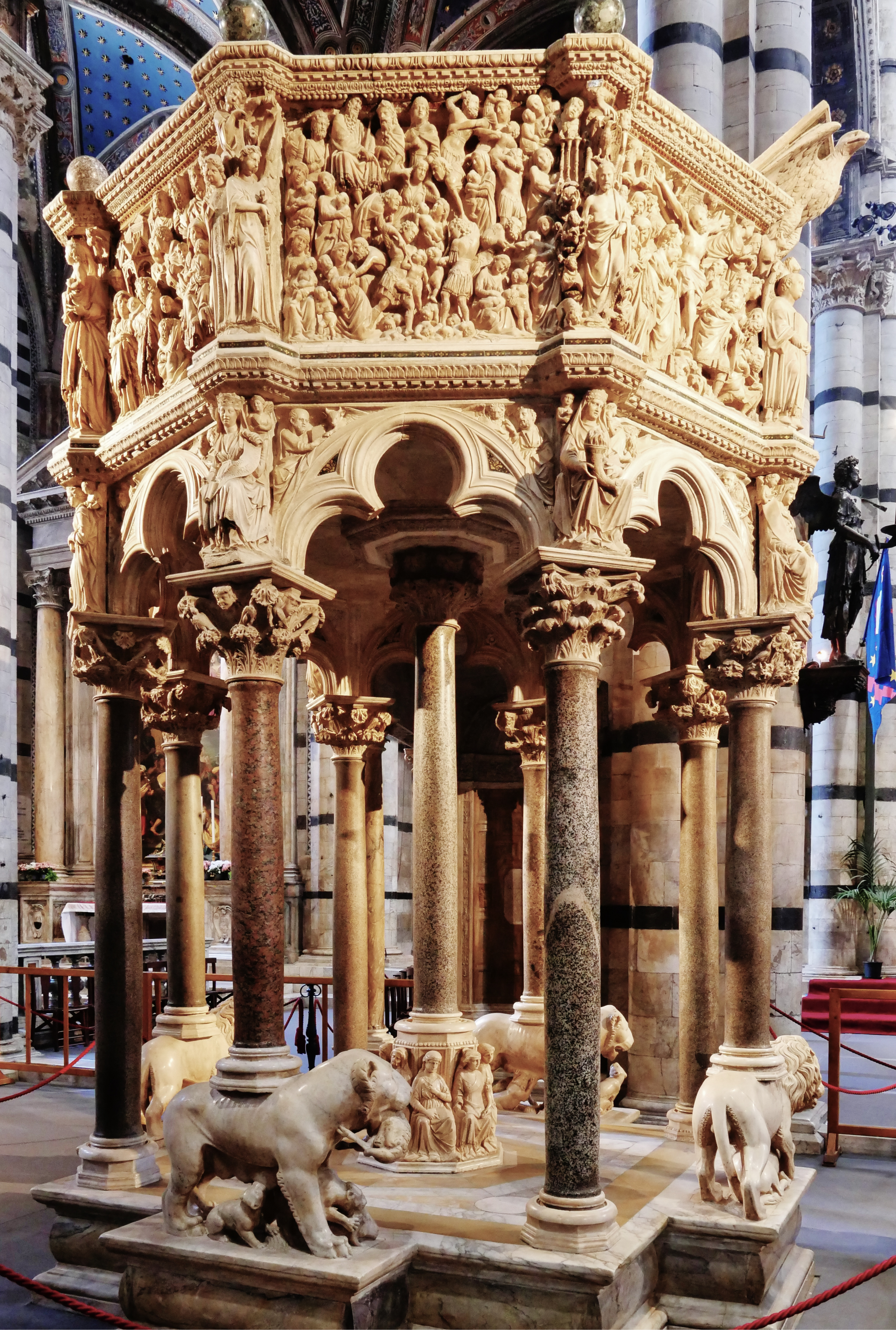
Pulpit by Nicola Pisano, 1265–1268

The pulpit was commissioned by Bishop Federico Visconti and sculpted in Carrara marble between the end of 1265 and November 1268 by Nicola Pisano and several other artists. This pulpit expresses the northern Gothic style adopted by Pisano, while still showing his classical influences. The whole message of the pulpit is concerned with the doctrine of Salvation and the Last Judgment. In the top level, seven reliefs narrate the Life of Christ. The many figures in each scene with their chiaroscuro effect, show a richness of surface, motion, and narrative. On the middle-level statuettes of the Evangelists and Prophets announce the salvation of mankind. The pulpit itself is the earliest remaining work in the cathedral. The staircase dates from 1543 and was built by Bartolomeo Neroni. At the same time, the pulpit was moved from the choir to its present location.

== The marble floor ==
The inlaid marble mosaic floor is one of the most ornate of its kind in Italy, covering the whole floor of the cathedral. Giorgio Vasari, an Italian Renaissance painter and architect, claimed the floor was “the most beautiful … great and magnificent pavement ever made.” This undertaking went on from the 14th to the 16th centuries, and about forty artists made their contribution, the majority of whom were Sienese. The floor consists of 56 panels in different sizes. Most have a rectangular shape, but the later ones in the transept are hexagons or rhombuses. They represent the sibyls, scenes from the Old Testament, allegories, virtues, and figures from the ancient world. Most are still in their original state. The earliest scenes were made by a graffito technique: drilling tiny holes and scratching lines in the marble and filling these with bitumen or mineral pitch. In a later stage black, white, green, red, and blue marble intarsia were used. This technique of marble inlay also evolved during the years, finally resulting in a vigorous contrast of light and dark.

The uncovered floor can only be seen for a period of six to ten weeks each year, generally including the month of September. The rest of the year, the pavements near the altar are covered, and only some near the entrance may be viewed.

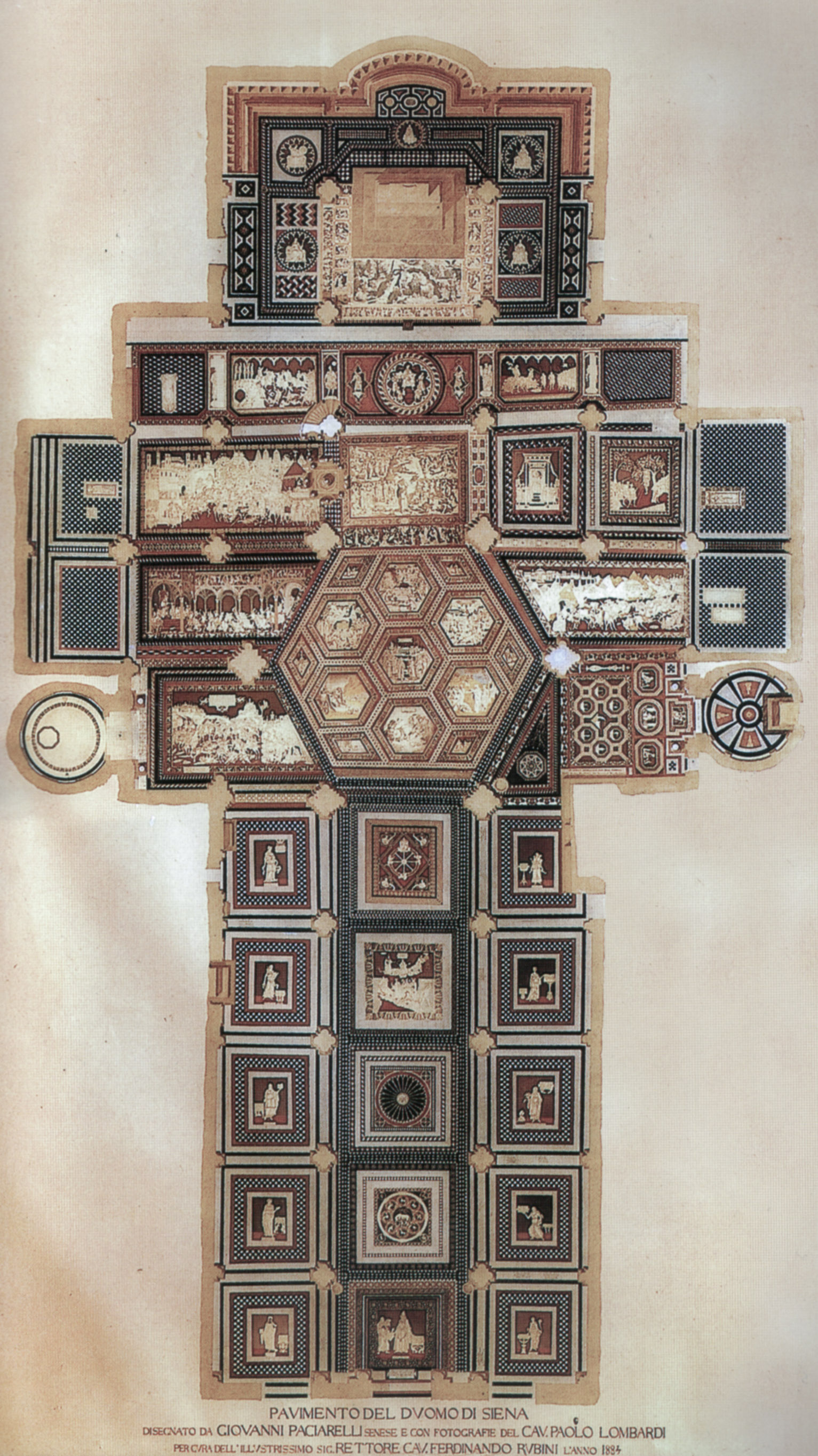
A lay-out of the floor of the cathedral

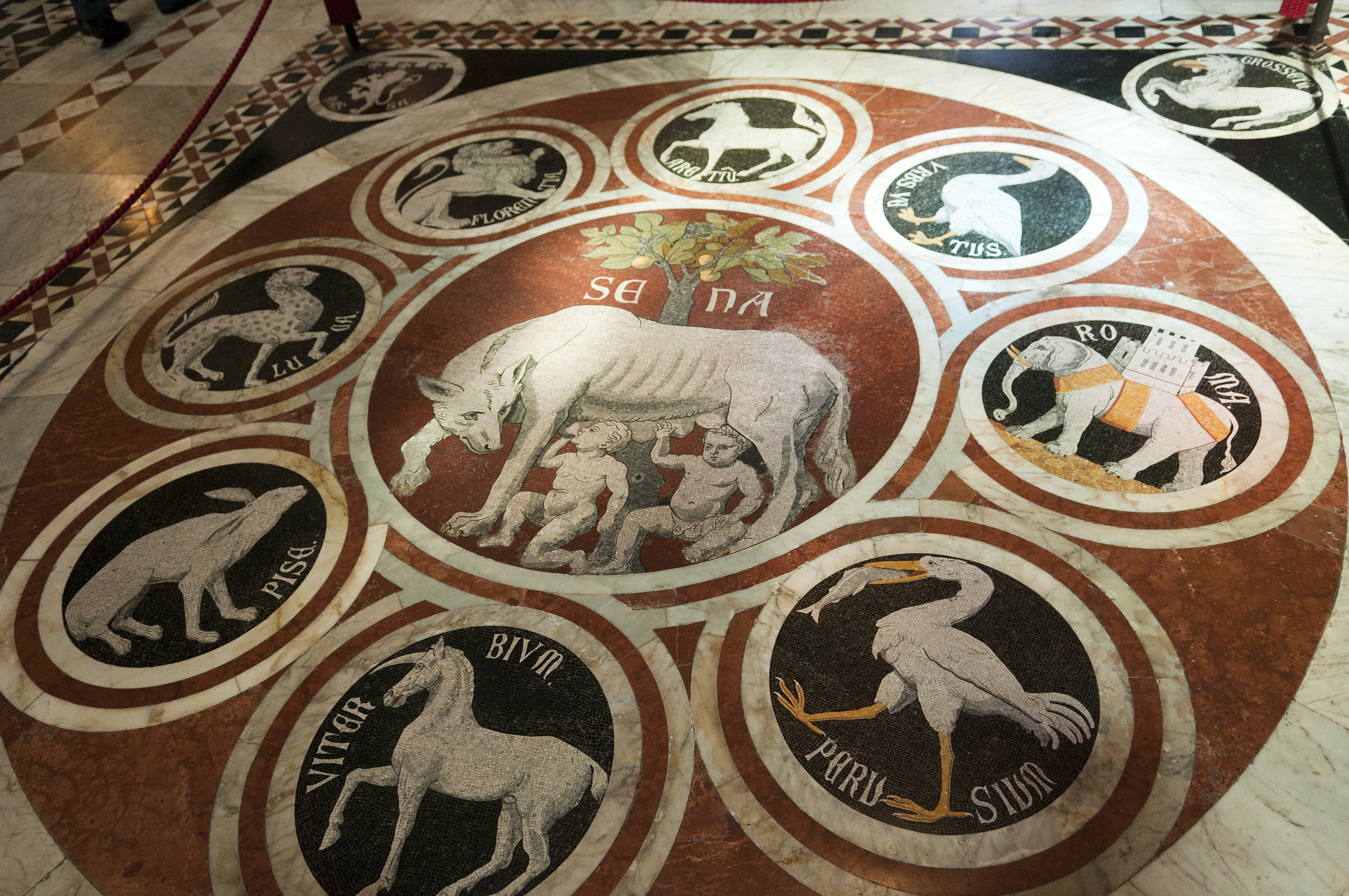
The She-Wolf, 1360s original reconstructed by Leopoldo Maccari (1865)

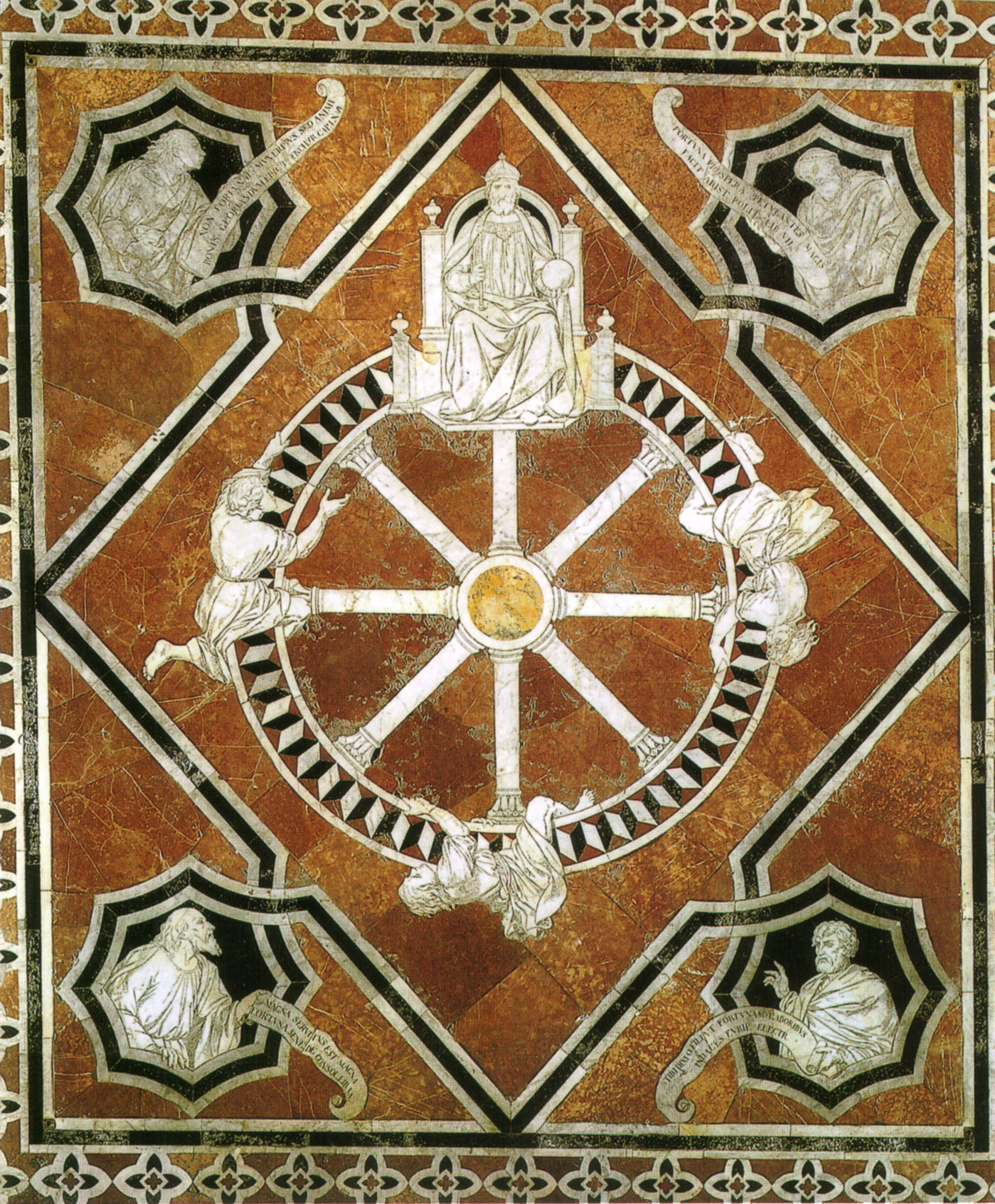
The Wheel of Fortune (1372/1864), nave

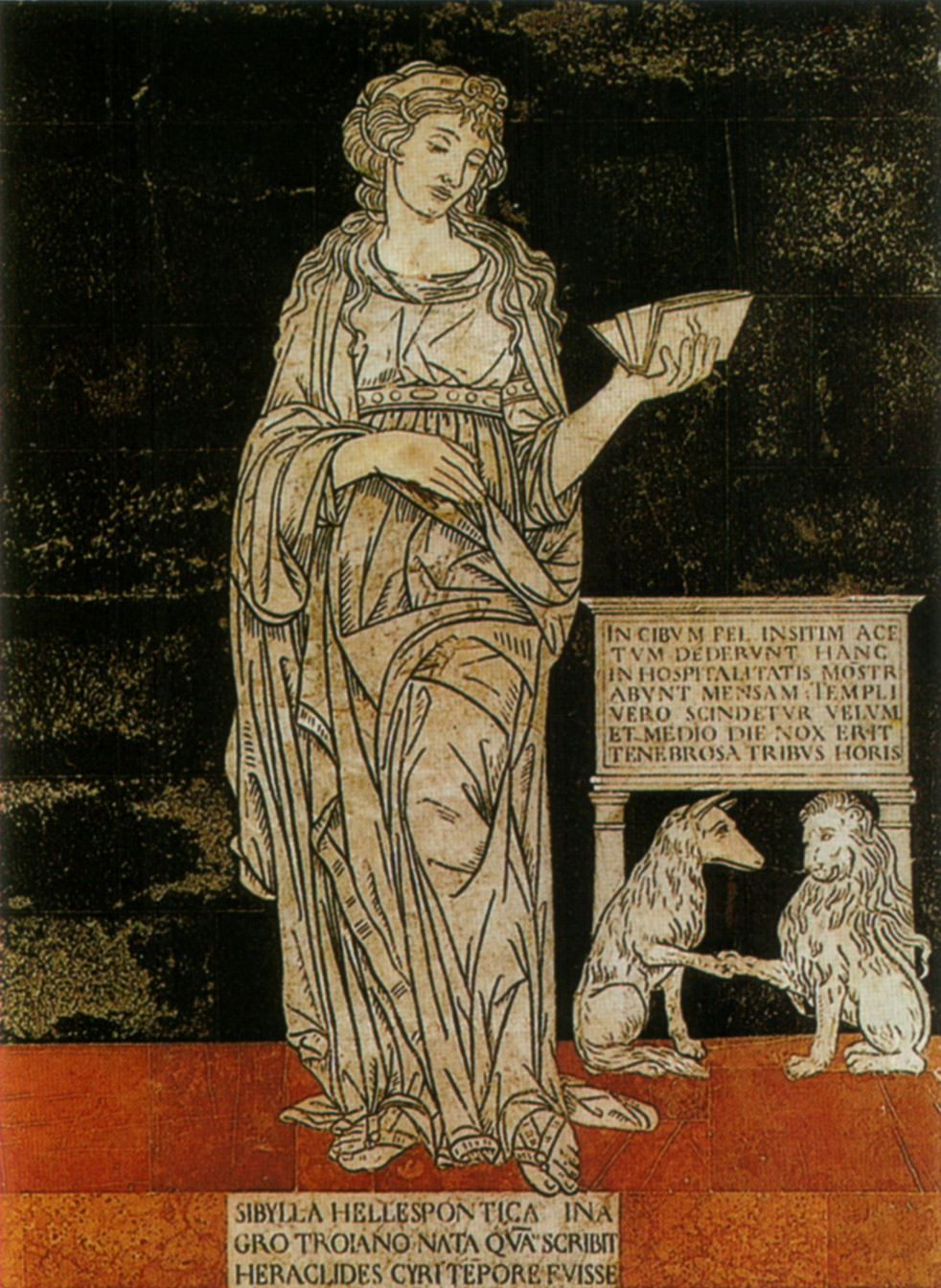
Neroccio di Bartolomeo de' Landi, The Hellespontine Sibyl (late 15th ct.), aisle

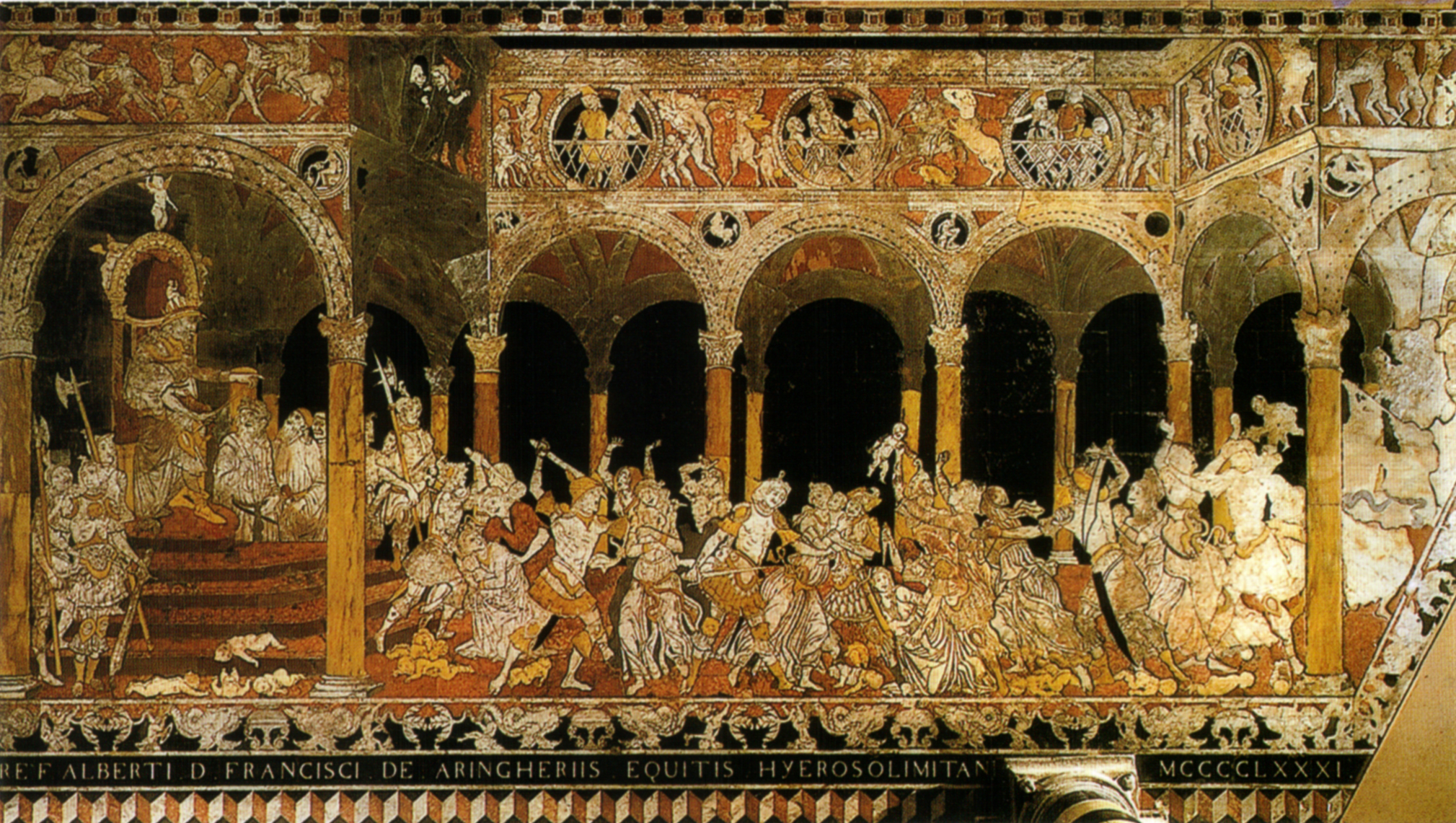
Matteo di Giovanni, The Slaughter of the Innocents (1484–1485), left transept

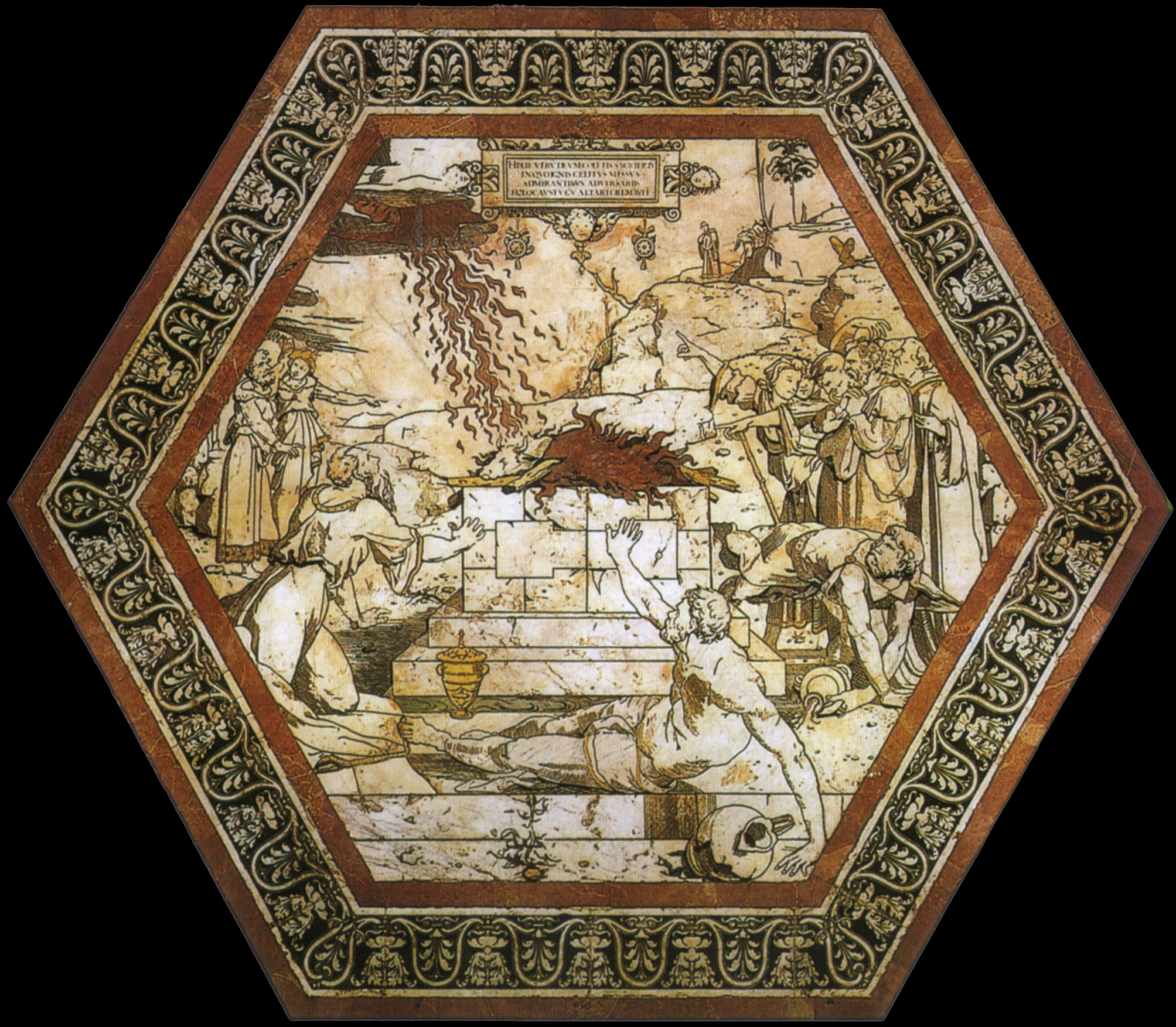
Beccafumi, Scene from the Lives of Elijah and Ahab (1519–1524), chancel

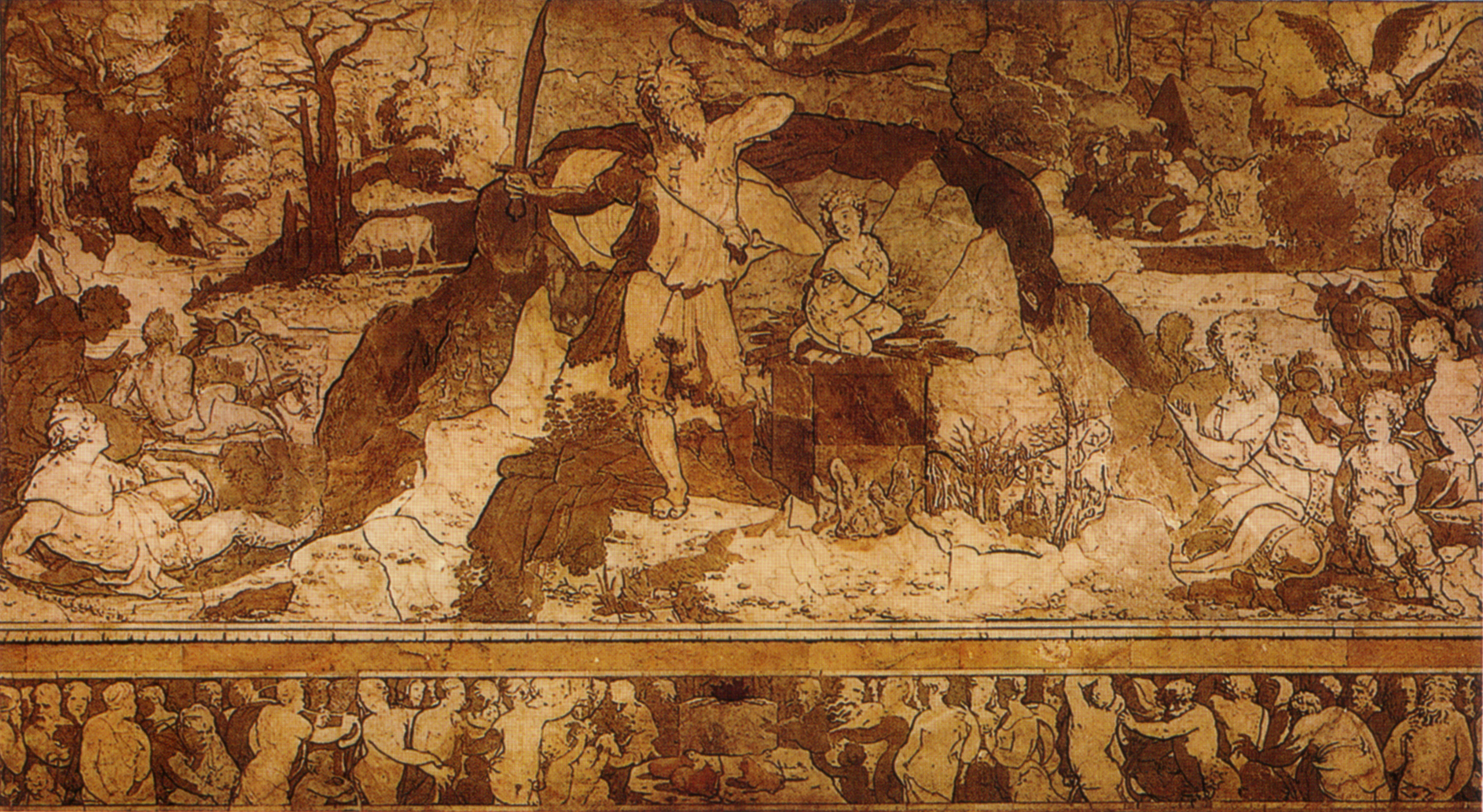
Detail from Abraham's Sacrifice by Beccafumi in the chancel

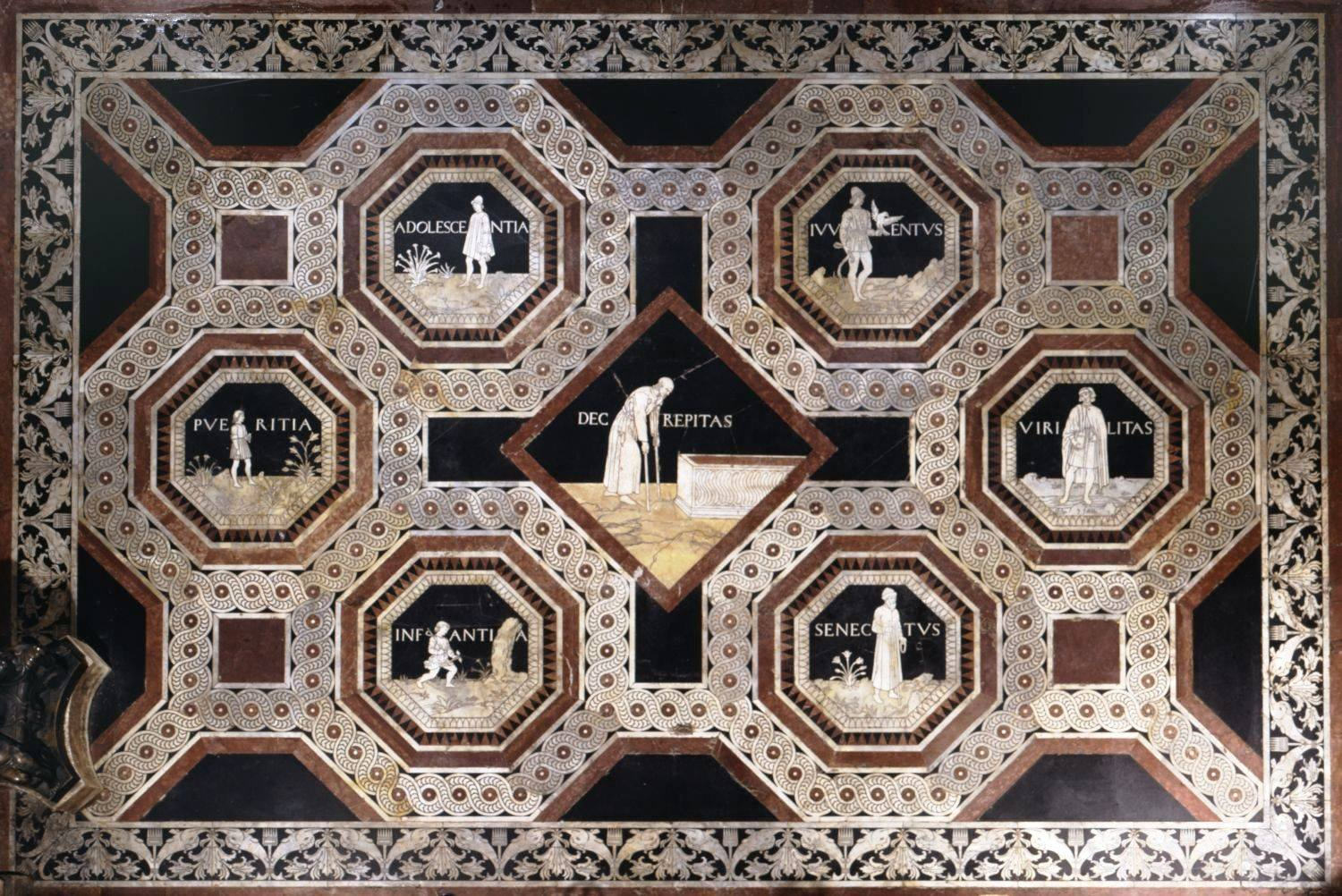
The Seven Ages of Man (1457/1871), right transept

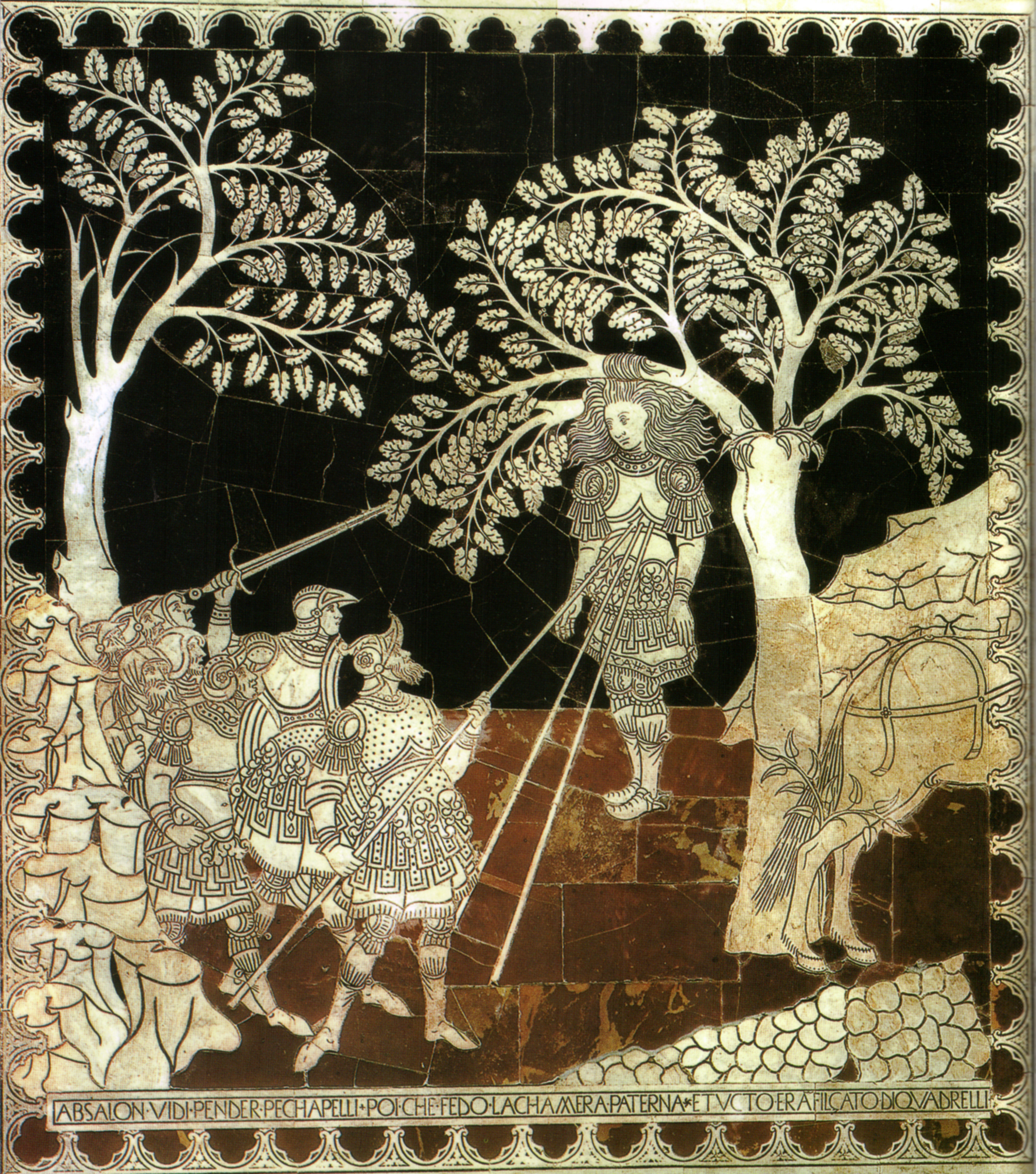
Pietro di Tommaso del Minella, The Death of Absalom (1447), right transept

=== Nave and aisles ===
==== Nave ====
The nave contains scenes from classical antiquity, which is very unusual in a church from this time period. These additions were primarily included due to the influence of two Sienese popes, Enea Silvio Piccolomini and Francesco Tedeschini Piccolomini, who believed that classical authors and figures held knowledge that is applicable across faith traditions.

At the entrance of the nave is a scene containing Hermes Trismegistus, a popular figure of the fifteenth century who was seen as "the founder of human wisdom." Designed by Giovanni di Stefano in 1488, this panel welcomes visitors into the church and introduces the theme of knowledge that develops throughout the nave and side aisles.

The She-Wolf Suckling Romulus and Remus, or The She-Wolf of Siena was originally created in the 1360s but heavily restored by Leopoldo Maccari in 1865. It portrays a wolf in the center surrounded by eight smaller circles, each depicting the emblem of major Italian cities.

Allegory of the Mount of Wisdom was designed by Pinturicchio in 1505 and completed in 1506 by Paolo Mannuci. This complicated scene includes a feminine personification of Fortune who is leading a group of wise men up a rocky, dangerous path to great the female personification of Wisdom.

The final panel in the nave is Wheel of Fortune (completed in 1372 and restored in 1864 by Leopoldo Maccari). The central image is of a wheel, where a king sits at the top and three male figures cling to the wheel. Surrounding the wheel are four figures depicting philosophers from the ancient world.

==== Side aisles ====
The side aisles along the nave are decorated with ten panels (five in each aisle) of the Sibyls. Each panel contains a Sibyl that is an allegorical representation of the known world of the time, as identified by an accompanying inscription: Persian Sibyl, Hellespontine Sibyl, Eritrean Sibyl, Phrygian Sibyl, Samian Sibyl, Delphic Sibyl, Libyan Sibyl, Cimmerian Sibyl, Cumaen Sibyl, and Tiburtine Sibyl. The effect of these allegorical figures represent the universality of the Christian message. Each full-length Sibyl is contrasted against a black and red background, and illustrated in a variety of poses with flowing robes.

=== Transepts and chancel ===
The scenes in the transepts and chancel represent biblical stories and mark the thematic transition from the scenes in the naves and aisles, which depicted figures from classical antiquity. The biblical scenes all focus on the theme of humanity’s salvation. In the Siena Cathedral, the chancel encompasses the crossing, the area below the dome, extending to the altar.

==== Left transept ====
The left transept contains three large panels: The Expulsion of Herod, The Slaughter of the Innocents, and The Story of Judith. The Expulsion of Herod by Benvenuto di Giovanni (1484–1485) in an incredibly intricate scene representing God’s revenge against Herod, the persecutor of John the Baptist. The Slaughter of the Innocents by Matteo di Giovanni is one of the most awe-inspiring panels of the cathedral, and has evoked emotional responses from visitors since its creation in 1481. The panel articulates the desperation of the mothers who are trying to save their babies from the slaughter of malicious guards. The Story of Judith by Francesco di Giorgio Martini (1473), located near the pulpit, depicts the Old Testament narrative of Judith beheading Holofernes, an enemy general.

==== Chancel ====
The majority of the panels in the chancel are grouped together in a large hexagonal portion of the pavement and depict Scenes from the Lives of Elijah and Ahab. Each of these scenes are either designed within a hexagonal panel or smaller rhombus-shaped panel. The upper half of these scenes (four of the seven hexagons and two of the six rhombuses) were completed from 1519–1524 by Domenico Beccafumi, who was the most renowned Sienese artist of his time. He worked on cartoons for the floor for thirty years (1518–1547) and made vast contributions to the cathedral’s pavement. The lower portion wasn’t completed until 1878 by Alessandro Franchi.

Beccafumi’s eight-meter long frieze Moses Striking Water from the Rock was completed in 1525. The work marks a technical and stylistic shift from Beccafumi’s earlier work. Here, the artist used different tones within the same piece of marble to create figures heavily contrasted by light and shadow. The subsequent section, also by Beccafumi, portrays Scenes from the Life of Moses on Mount Sinai. The large panel, completed from 1525–1529, is a continuation of the previous story and employs a similar technical and stylistic method. Rather than isolating each scene within a panel, the entire panel merges the scenes together in one combined section.

Next are five panels arranged horizontally: Joshua Defeats the Five Kings of the Amorites, David the Psalmist between David the Slingsman and Goliath Falling Backwards, and Samson Chastising the Philistines. The scenes portraying David are credited to Domenico di Niccolò dei Cori (1413–1423), the first known artist to work on the panels. His successor, Paolo di Martino, completed Joshua Defeats the Five Kings of the Amorites and Samson Chastising the Philistines between 1424 and 1426 which contain more details than the previous panels.

The final panel in the chancel, located directly in front of the altar, is Abraham’s Sacrifice of Isaac. Completed in 1547 by Beccafumi, the scene contains one large panel with the story, surrounded by smaller rectangular panels of related scenes.

Bordering the main altar is a geometric pattern containing five circular panels which depict Mercy and The Four Cardinal Virtues (Fortitude, Justice, Prudence, and Good Government). The panels date from 1406, as established by a payment made to Marchese d'Adamo and his fellow workers who executed the cartoons of Sienese painters.

==== Right transept ====
The right transept contains five sections of panels: The Seven Ages of Man, Religion and the Theological Virtues, The Story of Jephthah, The Death of Absalom, and Emperor Sigismund.

The Seven Ages of Man is a collection of six octagonal panels surrounding a central rectangular panel and woven together by a geometric rope-inspired pattern. They depict the stages of life a man goes through, from infancy to death. The majority of the original work by Antonio Federighi in 1457 was reconstructed in 1871.

Religion and the Theological Virtues is a set of panels, depicting an allegory of religion and three personifications of theological virtues (Hope, Faith, and Charity). The original works from 1780 were replaced a century later by designs by Alessandro Franchi.

The Story of Jephthah is credited to Francesco di Giorgio Martini, and notably contains sixty characters throughout the panel. The finer details of the narrative have been lost over time.

The Death of Absalom by Pietro di Tommaso del Minella (1447) narrates a group of soldiers finding King David’s sin, Absalom, hanging dead from a tree. The figures are contrasted by a foreground of red marble, and a background of black marble.

In 1434 the renowned painter Domenico di Bartolo completed the panel Emperor Sigismund Enthroned. The Holy Roman Emperor Sigismund was popular in Siena, because he resided there for ten months on his way to Rome for his coronation.Today, the details are incredibly faded.

== Works of art ==
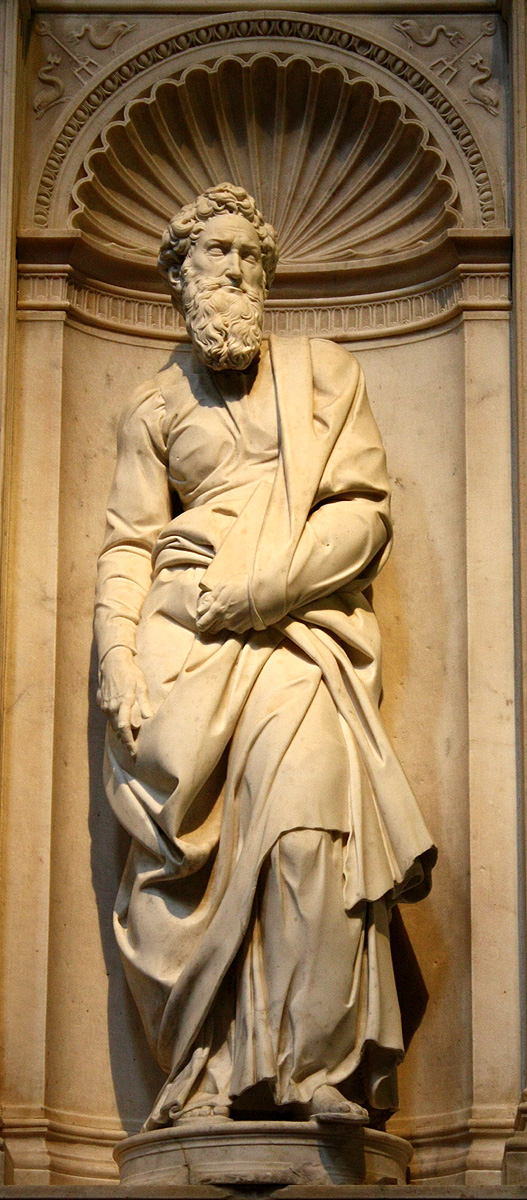
Saint Paul by Michelangelo Buonarroti

The cathedral's valuable pieces of art including The Feast of Herod by Donatello, and works by Bernini and the young Michelangelo make it an extraordinary museum of Italian sculpture. The Annunciation between St. Ansanus and St. Margaret, a masterwork of Gothic painting by Simone Martini and Lippo Memmi, decorated a side altar of the church until 1799, when it was moved to the Uffizi of Florence.

The funeral monument for cardinal Riccardo Petroni (1250–1314, a jurisconsult of Pope Boniface VIII) was erected between 1317 and 1318 by the Sienese sculptor Tino di Camaino. He had succeeded his father as the master-builder of the Siena cathedral. The marble monument in the left transept is the earliest example of 14th-century funeral architecture. It is composed of a richly decorated sarcophagus, held aloft on the shoulders of four statues. Above the sarcophagus, two angels draw apart a curtain, revealing the cardinal lying on his deathbed, accompanied by two guardian angels. The monument is crowned by a spired tabernacle with statues of the Madonna and Child, Saint Peter and Saint Paul.

In the pavement, in front of this monument, lies the bronze tombstone of Bishop Giovanni Pecci, bishop of Grosseto, made by Donatello in 1427. It shows the dead prelate laid out in a concave bier in highly illusionistic low relief. Looking at it obliquely from the end of the tomb, gives the impression of three-dimensionality. It was originally located in front of the high altar and moved to the present location in 1506.

The wall tomb of bishop Tommaso Piccolomini del Testa is set above the small door leading to the bell tower. It is the work of the Sienese painter and sculptor Neroccio di Bartolomeo de' Landi in 1483.

The Piccolomini Altarpiece, left of the entrance to the library, is the work of the Lombard sculptor Andrea Bregno in 1483. This altarpiece is remarkable because of the four sculptures in the lower niches, made by the young Michelangelo between 1501 and 1504: Saint Peter, Saint Paul, Saint Gregory (with the help of an assistant) and Saint Pius. On top of the altar is the Madonna and Child, a sculpture (probably) by Jacopo della Quercia.

Many of the Duomo's furnishings, reliquaries, and artwork, have been removed to the adjacent Museo dell'Opera del Duomo. This includes Duccio's Maestà altarpiece, some panels of which are scattered around the world or lost. Duccio's large stained glass window, original to the building, was removed out of precaution during WWII for fear of shattering from bombs or fire. A replica has been installed in the Duomo ever since. The glass depicts a typical Sienese religious subject- three panels of the Death, Assumption, and Coronation of Mary, flanked by the city's most important patron saints, Saint Ansanus; Saint Sabinus; Saint Crescentius; and Saint Victor, and in four corners are the Four Evangelists.

== Chapel of Saint John the Baptist ==
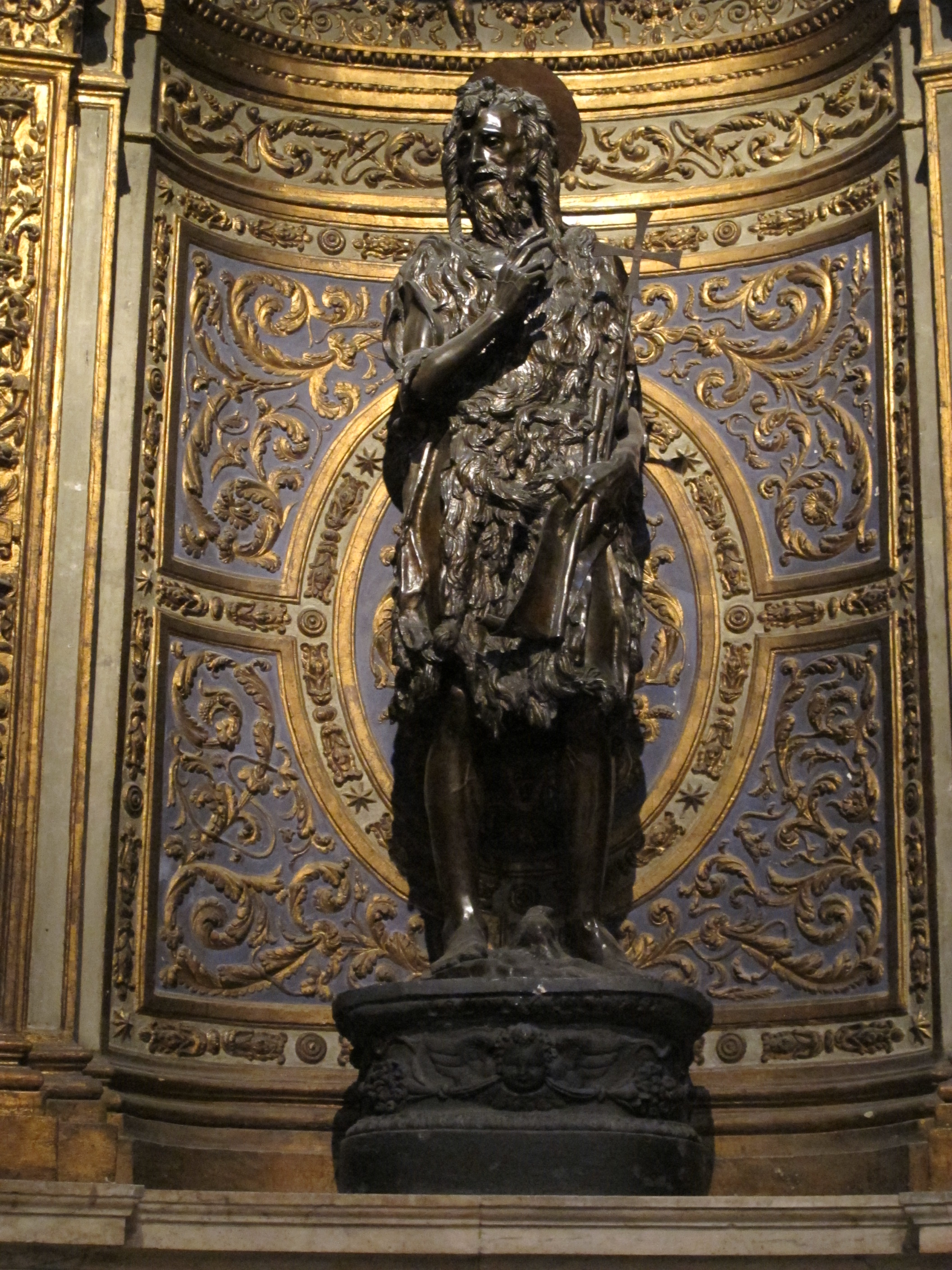
Saint John the Baptist by Donatello, c. 1455

The Chapel of Saint John the Baptist is situated in the left transept. At the back of this chapel, amidst the rich Renaissance decorations, is the bronze statue of St. John the Baptist by Donatello (c. 1455). In the middle of the chapel is a 15th-century marble font. But most impressive in this chapel are the eight frescos by Pinturicchio, which were commissioned by Alberto Aringhieri and painted between 1504 and 1505. Two of the frescos were repainted in the 17th century, while a third was completely replaced in 1868. The original paintings in the chapel are: Nativity of John the Baptist, John the Baptist in the Desert and John the Baptist Preaching. He also painted two portraits: Aringhieri with the Cloak of the Order of the Knights of Malta and Kneeling Knight in Armour. These two portraits show us a very detailed background.

== The Chigi Chapel ==
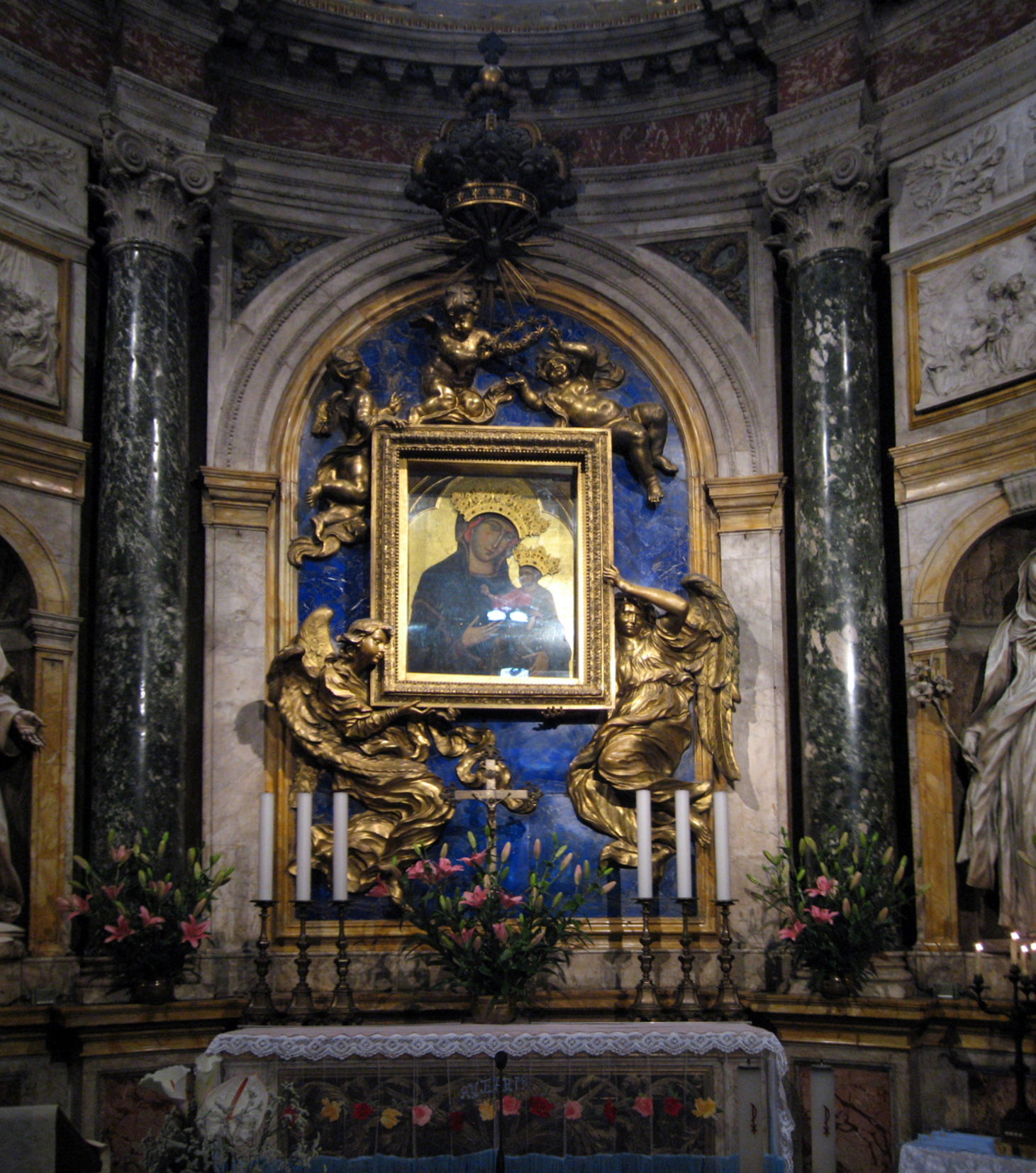
Madonna del Voto

The small Chigi Chapel (or Cappella della Madonna del Voto) is situated in the right transept. It is the last, most luxurious sculptural addition to the Duomo, and was commissioned in 1659 by the Sienese Chigi pope Alexander VII. This circular chapel with a gilded dome was built by the German architect Johann Paul Schor to the baroque designs of Gian Lorenzo Bernini, replacing a 15th-century chapel. At the back of the chapel is the Madonna del Voto (by a follower of Guido da Siena, 13th century), that even today is much venerated and receives each year the homages of the contrade. On the eve of the battle of Montaperti (4 September 1260) against Florence, the city of Siena had dedicated itself to the Madonna. The victory of the Sienese, against all odds, over the much more numerous Florentines was ascribed to her miraculous protection.

Two of the four marble sculptures in the niches, are by Bernini himself: Saint Jerome and Mary Magdalene. The other two are Saint Bernardine (Antonio Raggi) and Saint Catherine of Siena (Ercole Ferrata). The eight marble columns are originally from the Lateran Palace in Rome. The bronze gate at the entrance is by Giovanni Artusi.

== Piccolomini Library ==
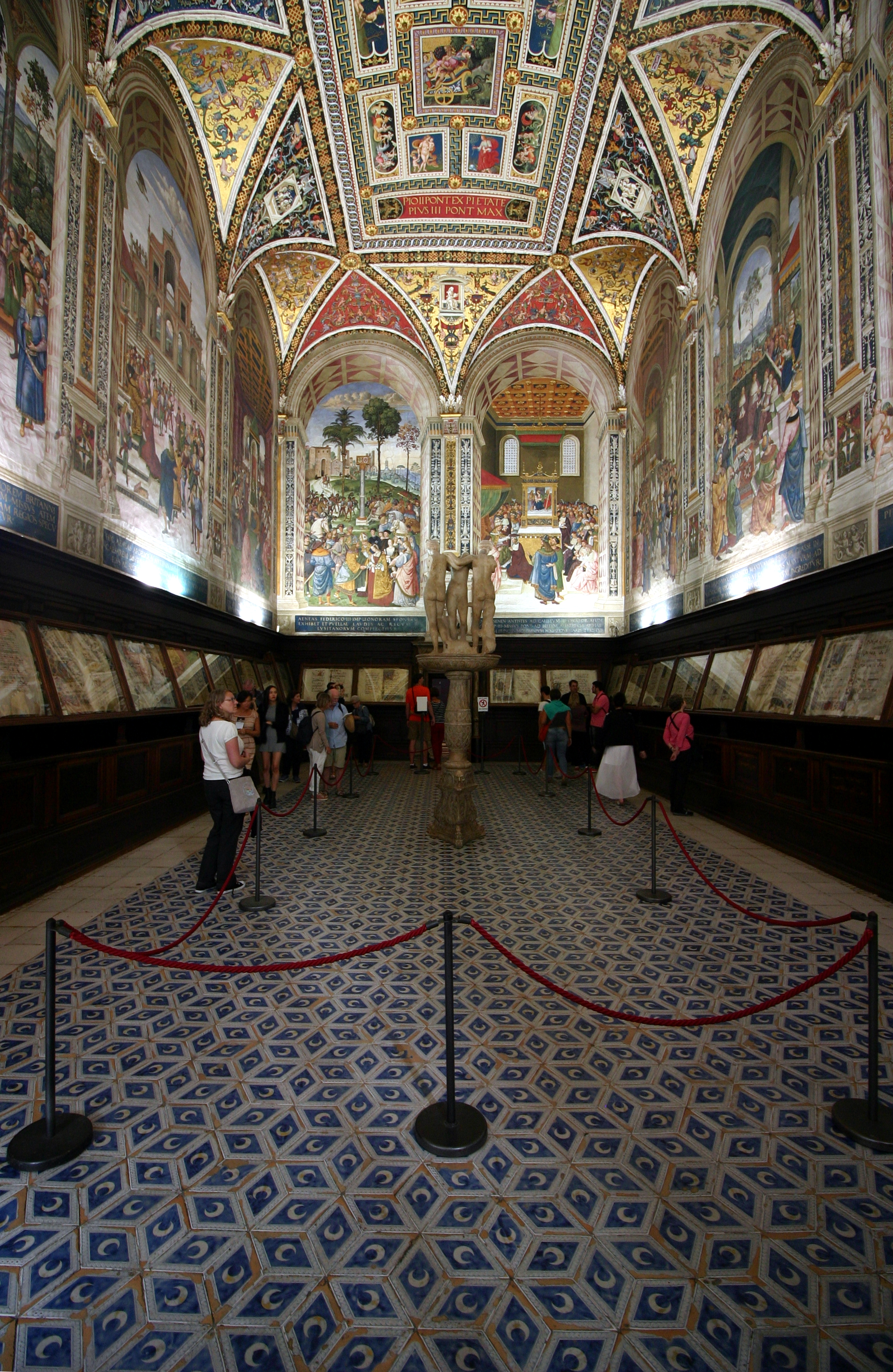
Piccolomini Library

The library was commissioned by cardinal Francesco Todeschini Piccolomini (then archbishop of Siena and the future pope Pius III) in 1492. It was intended as a repository of the book collection of his uncle cardinal Enea Silvio Piccolomini, eventually Pope Pius II. This collection included works by his uncle, books in Greek, Latin, and Hebrew, and many rare parchments. Today, many of the original collection has been lost, but the library still houses many exquisite illuminated Psalters executed by Liberale da Verona and Girolamo da Cremona between 1466 and 1478 and later carried on by other Sienese illuminators.

Adjoined to the left-side of the cathedral, the entrance is set apart by a large marble wall monument, with two grand arches. This marble entrance was constructed by Lorenzo di Mariano in 1497. It contains a round relief of St. John the Evangelist (probably) by Giovanni di Stefano and, below the altar, a polychrome Pietà by the sculptor Alberto di Betto da Assisi in 1421. Above this marble monument is a fresco of the Papal Coronation of Pius III by Pinturicchio in 1504.

The walls are covered with frescos depicting ten scenes from the life of Pope Pius II, to whom the library is dedicated. Pinturicchio painted this cycle of frescos around the library between 1502 and 1507, representing Raphael and himself in several of them. There is some controversy whether these frescos were based, at least partially, on designs by Raphael. This masterpiece is full of striking detail and vivacious colours. Each scene is explained in Latin by the text below, and demonstrate the remarkable events from the secular and religious career of Enea Silvio Piccolomini, first as a high prelate, then bishop, a cardinal and ultimately as pope Pius II:

1. Enea Silvio Piccolomini (ESP) leaves for the Council of Basel. The storm scene in the background is a first in western art.
2. ESP, ambassador at the Scottish Court
3. ESP crowned court poet by emperor Frederick III
4. ESP makes an act of submission to Pope Eugene IV
5. ESP, bishop of Siena, presents emperor Frederick III with his bride-to-be Eleanora of Portugal at the Porta Camollia in Siena.
6. ESP receives the cardinal's hat in 1456
7. ESP, enters the Lateran as pontiff in 1458
8. Pius II convokes a Diet of Princes at Mantua to proclaim a new crusade in 1459
9. Pius II canonizes Saint Catherine of Siena in 1461
10. Pius II arrives in Ancona to launch the crusade.

The ceiling is decorated in four panels, which each contain mythological subjects and are boarded by colorful, geometric patterns. They were executed between 1502 and 1503 by Pinturicchio and his assistants. The floor, made of blue ceramics with crescent moons, adds another element of color to the room. In the center of the room is a marble statue of the Three Graces with entwined arms. The statue is a Roman copy that was bought specifically to be placed in the library.

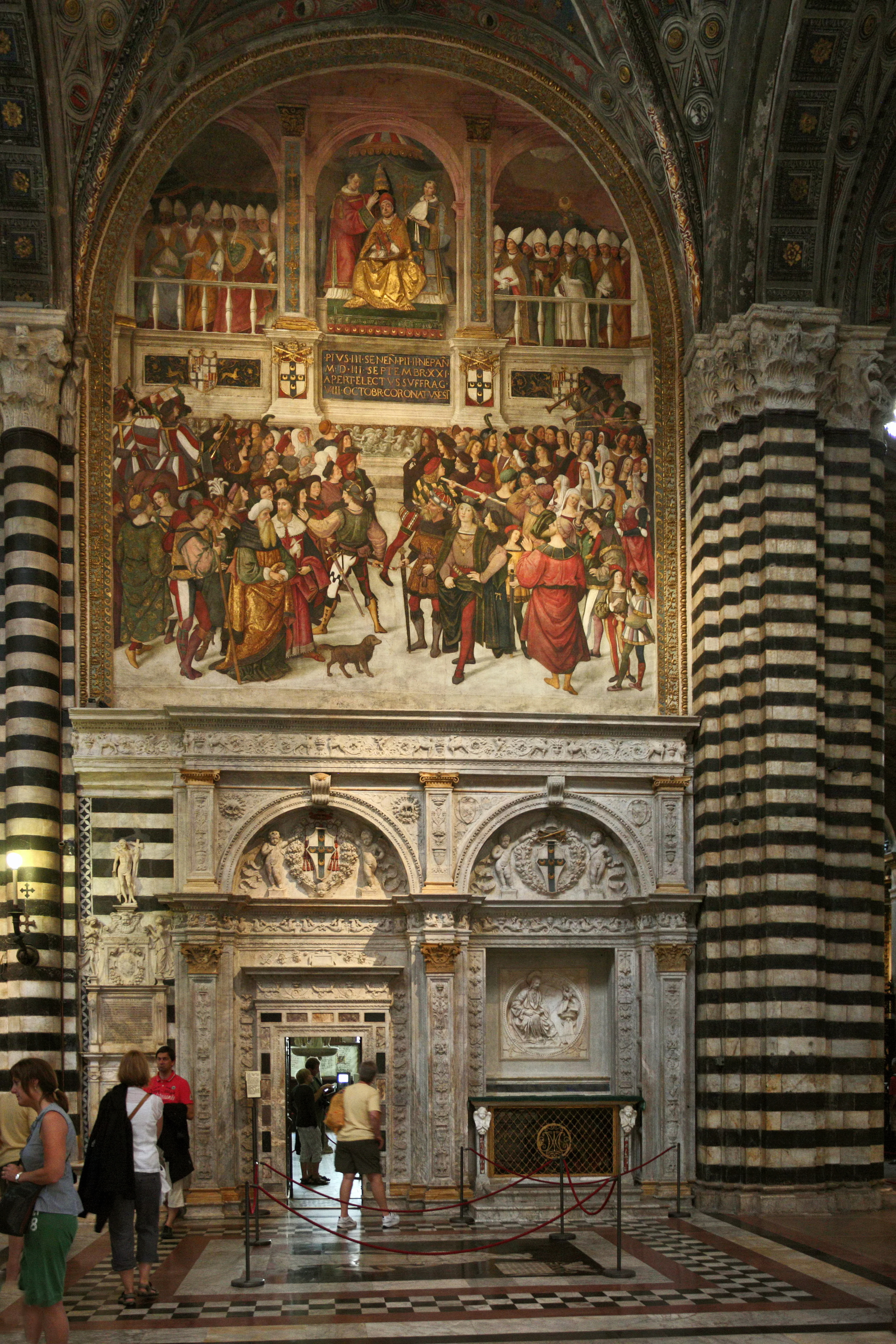
Piccolomini Library portal by Lorenzo di Mariano (1497). Above the Papal Coronation of Pius III by Pinturicchio in 1504.

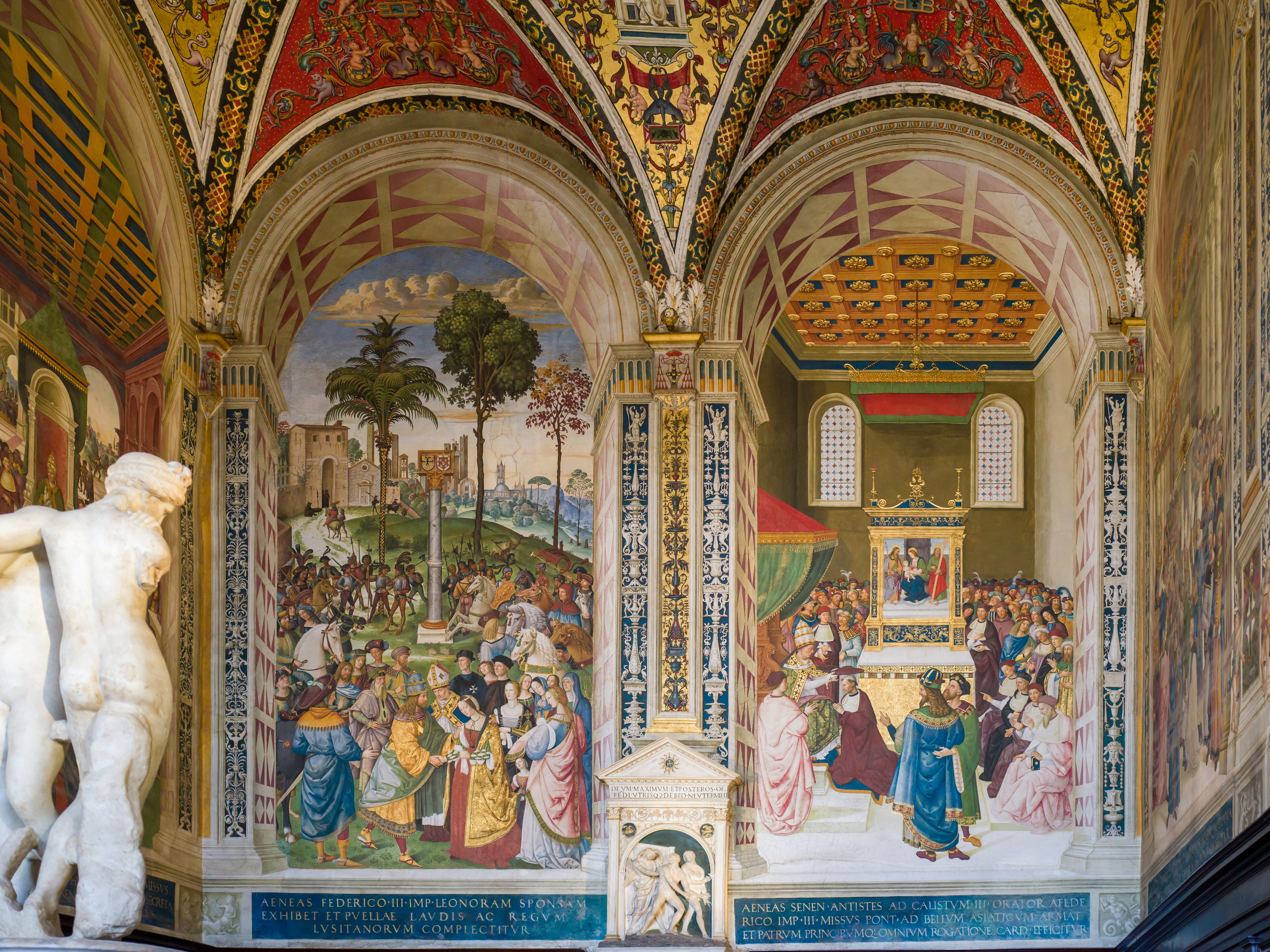
Frescos of Enea Silvio Piccolomini presenting Eleanora of Portugal to the emperor Frederick III and receiving the cardinal's hat in 1456

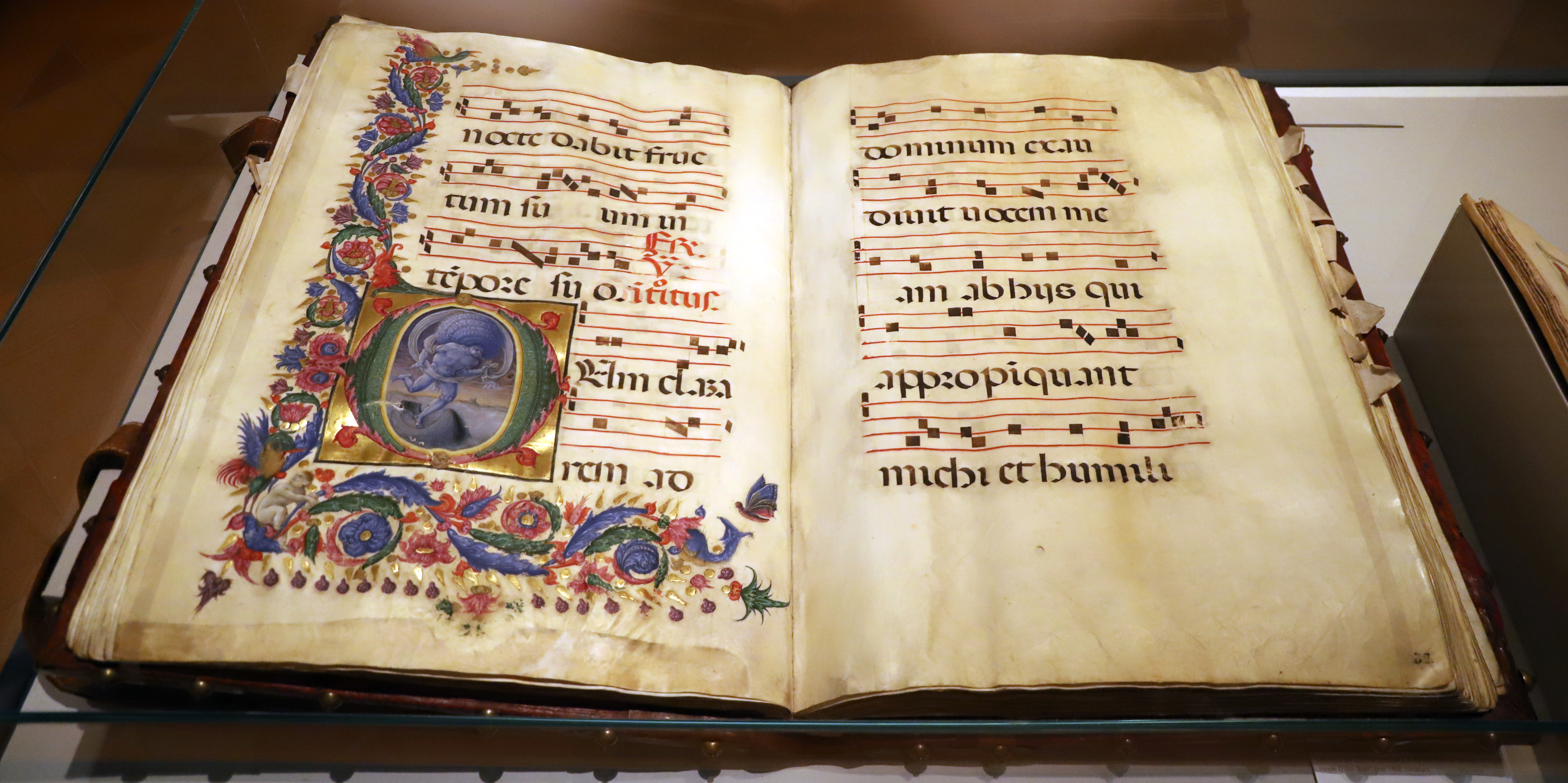
One of the many Illuminated manuscripts displayed in the library

== Baptistry ==
Unlike Florence or Pisa, Siena did not build a separate baptistry. The baptistry is located underneath the eastern bays of the choir of the Duomo. The construction of the interior was largely performed under Camaino di Crescentino and was completed about 1325. The main attraction is the hexagonal baptismal font, containing sculptures and refliefs by Donatello, Jacopo della Quercia and Lorenzo Ghiberti.

== Crypt ==
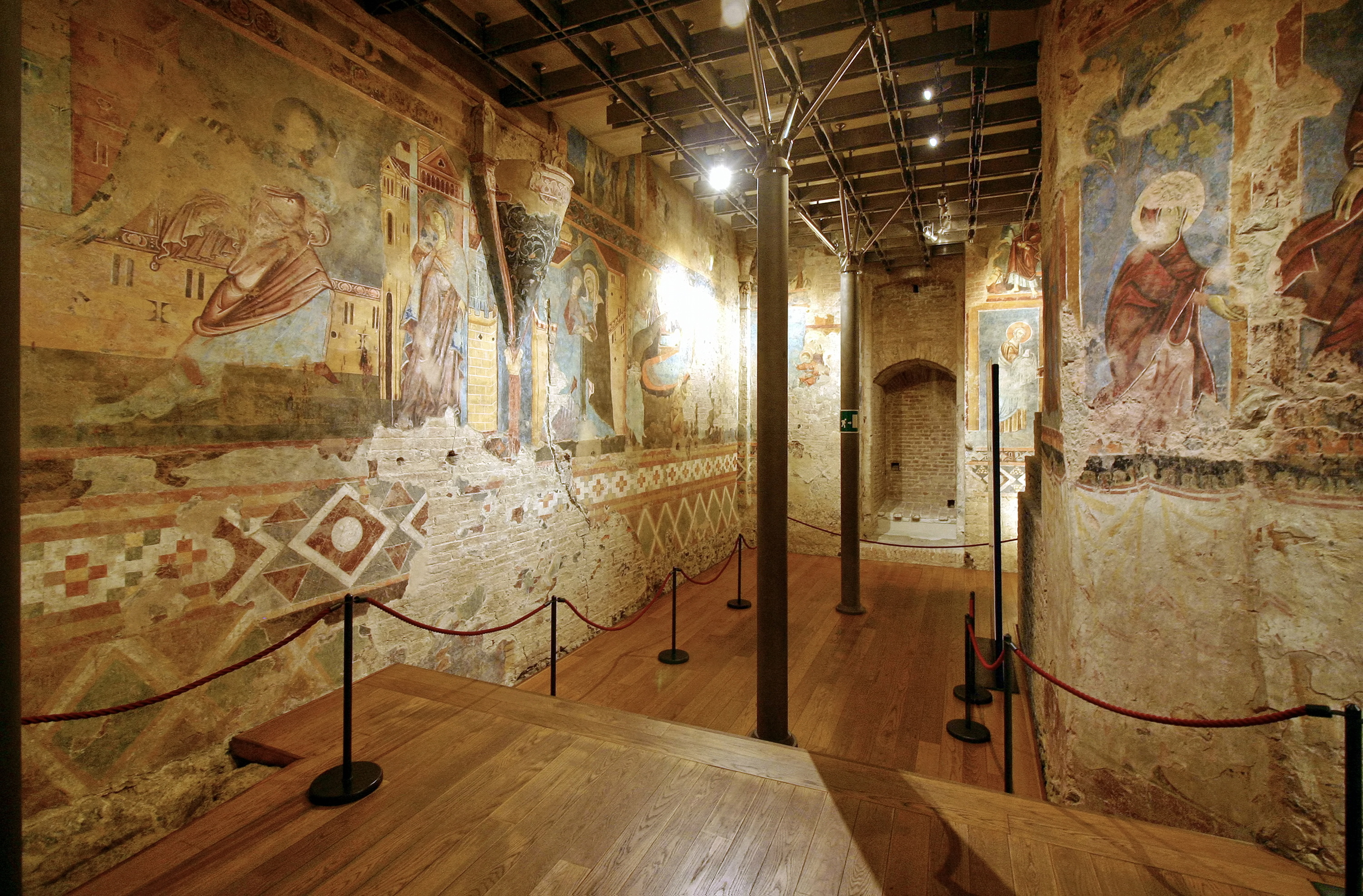
South wall of the crypt

Located under the Duomo near the baptistry, and rediscovered in 1999 during an excavation, is the cathedral's crypt. Although scholars prior to 1999 believed there was a crypt, as recorded in medieval sources, they did not know to what extent this room was preserved. There is evidence that the room was filled with dirt and other material waste in the beginning of the 15th century, with more deposits added in the first half of the 18th century. The room was decorated towards the end of the 13th century by a series of frescos, which survive today in vivid color. These frescos, covering each wall as well as the two pillars supporting the room, depict forty-five scenes from the Old and New Testaments including the Passion of Jesus. These scenes are bordered by geometric patterns and other embellishments.

== See also ==
- High medieval domes
- Late medieval domes
- List of Gothic Cathedrals in Europe
- Roman Catholic Marian churches
- Black Death in Northern Italy

== Gallery ==
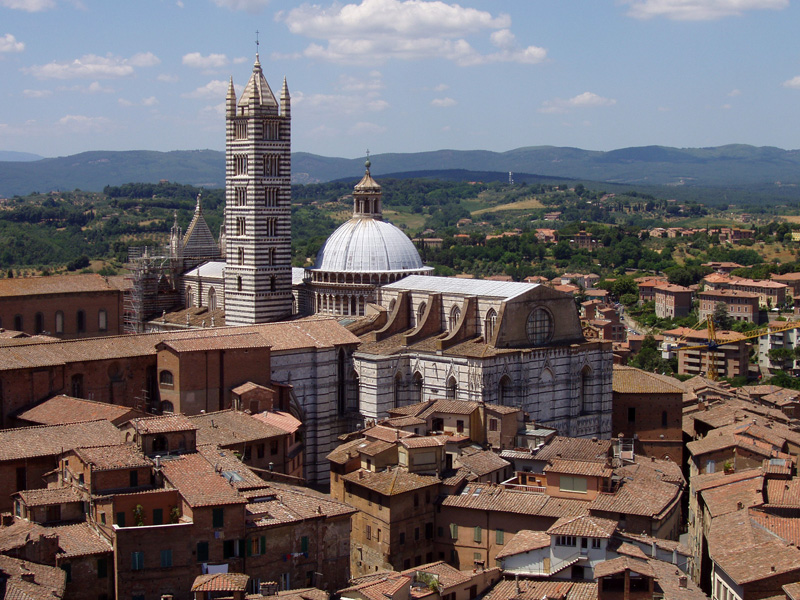
Siena Cathedral

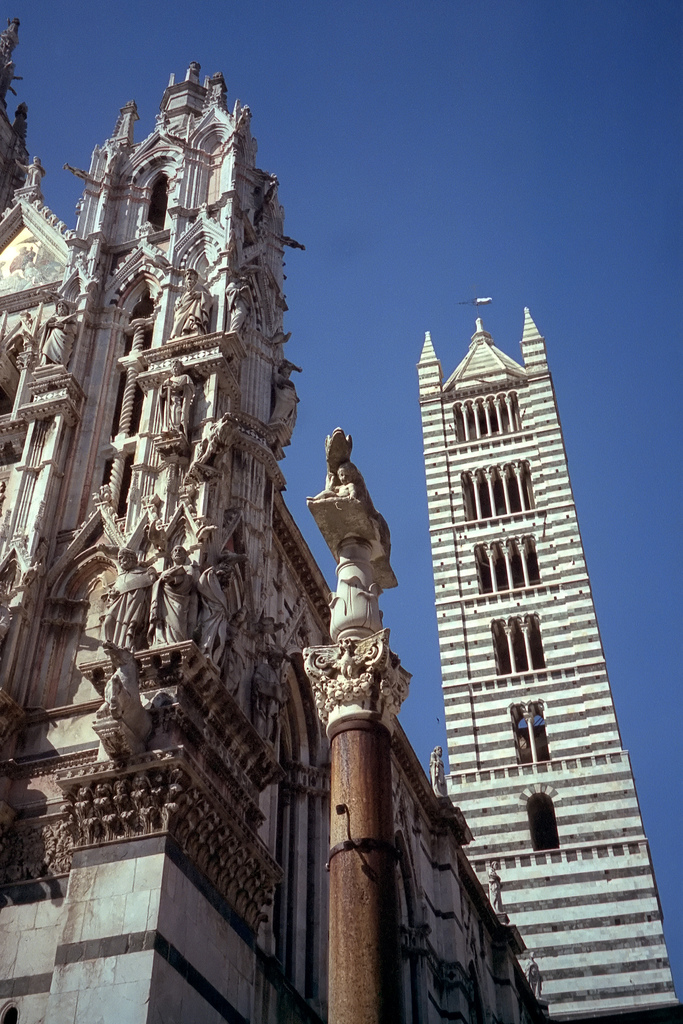
Façade, bell tower, and column with Romulus and Remus

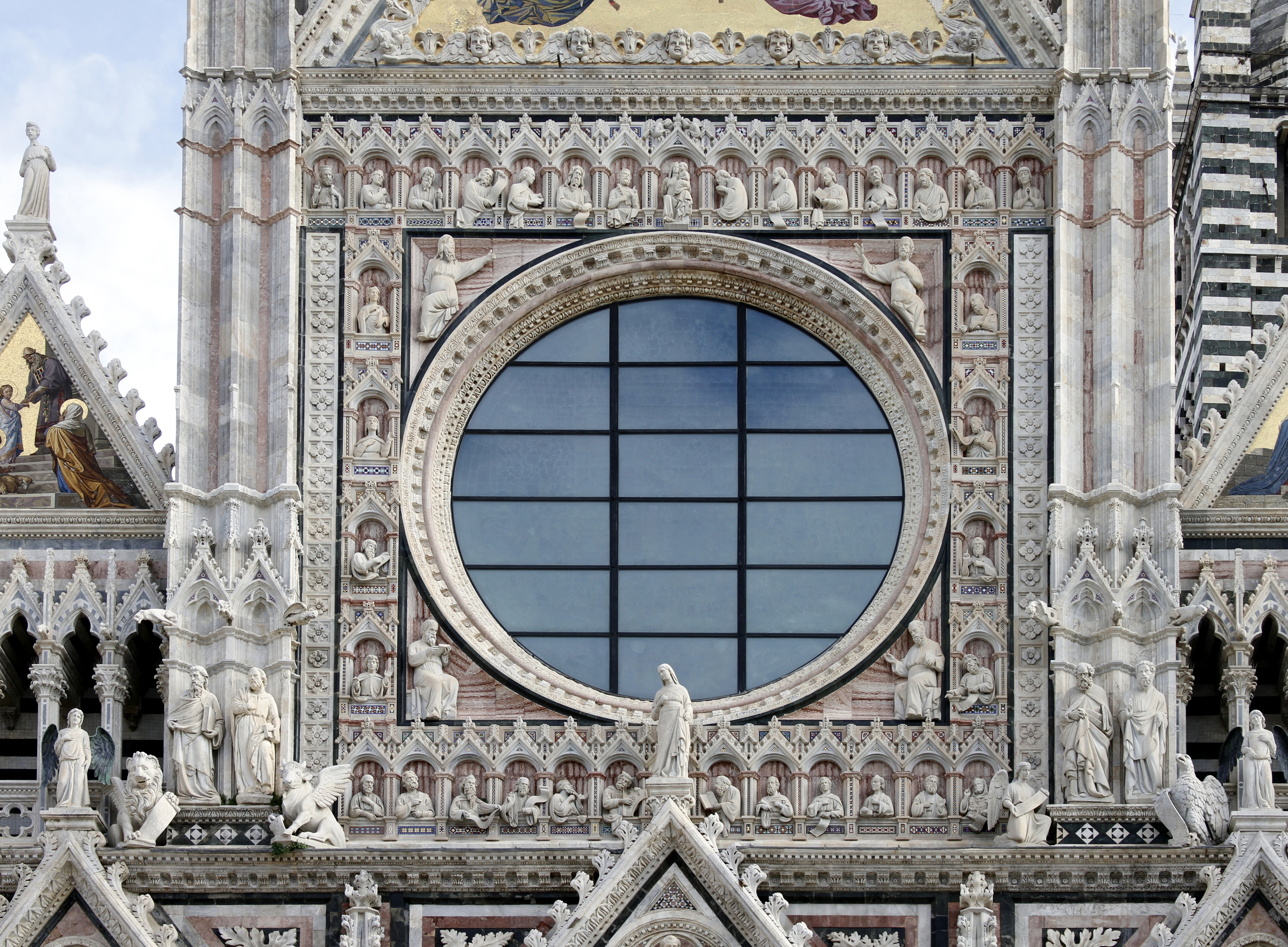
Oculus and vivid figures of the west facade

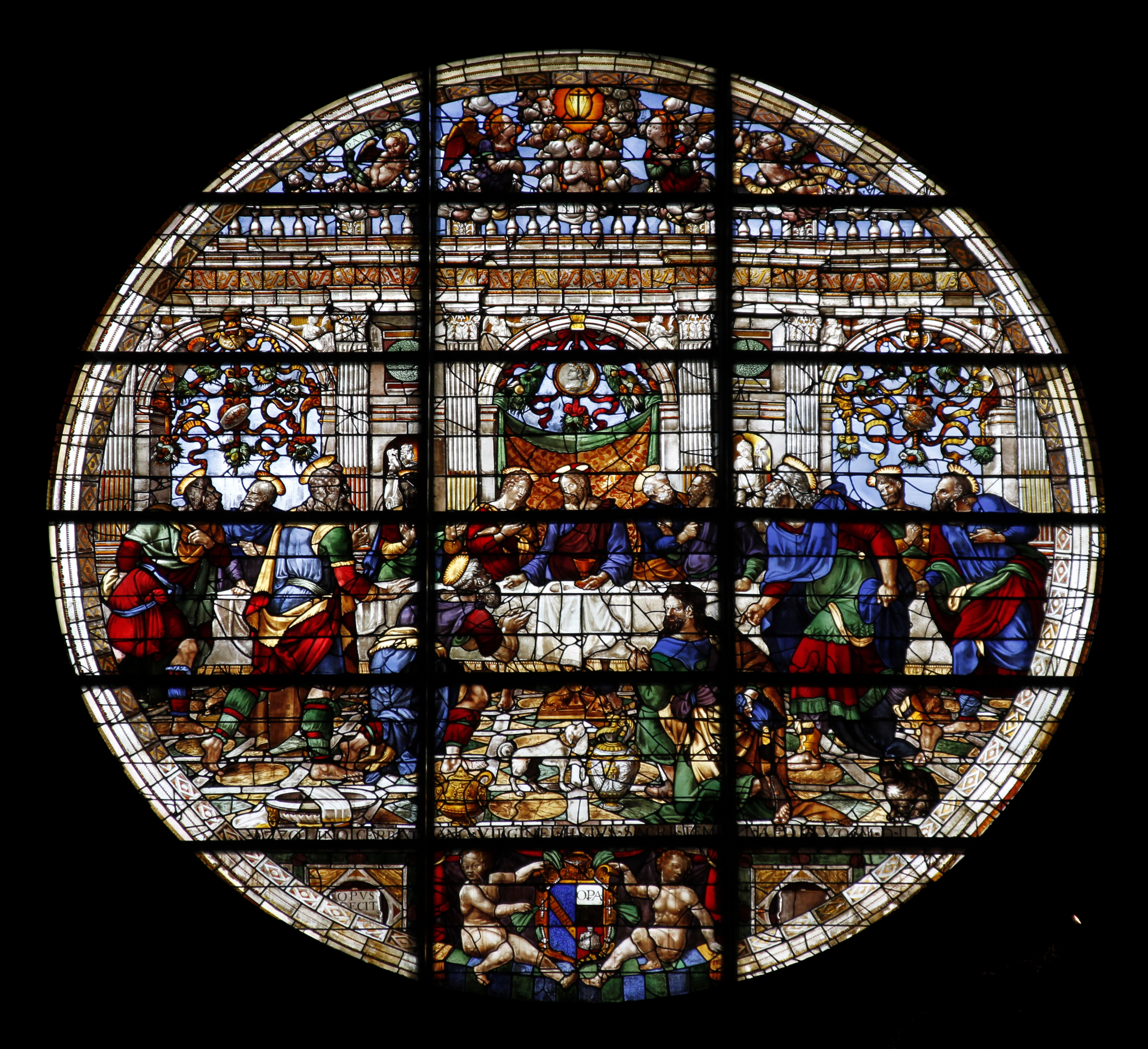
Western stained-glass window depicting the Last Supper

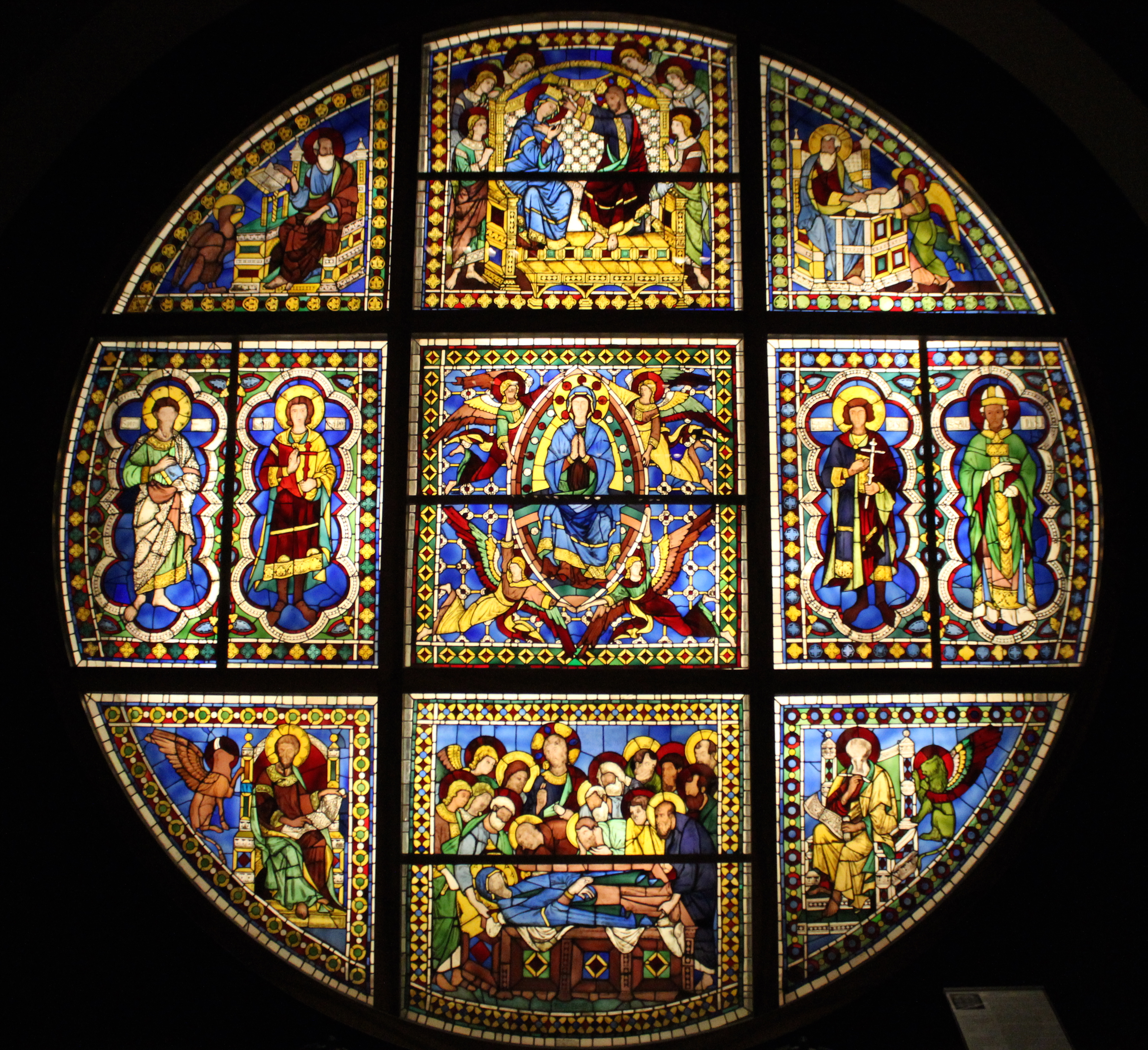
The Rose Window by Duccio, 1287 (original, Cathedral Museum)

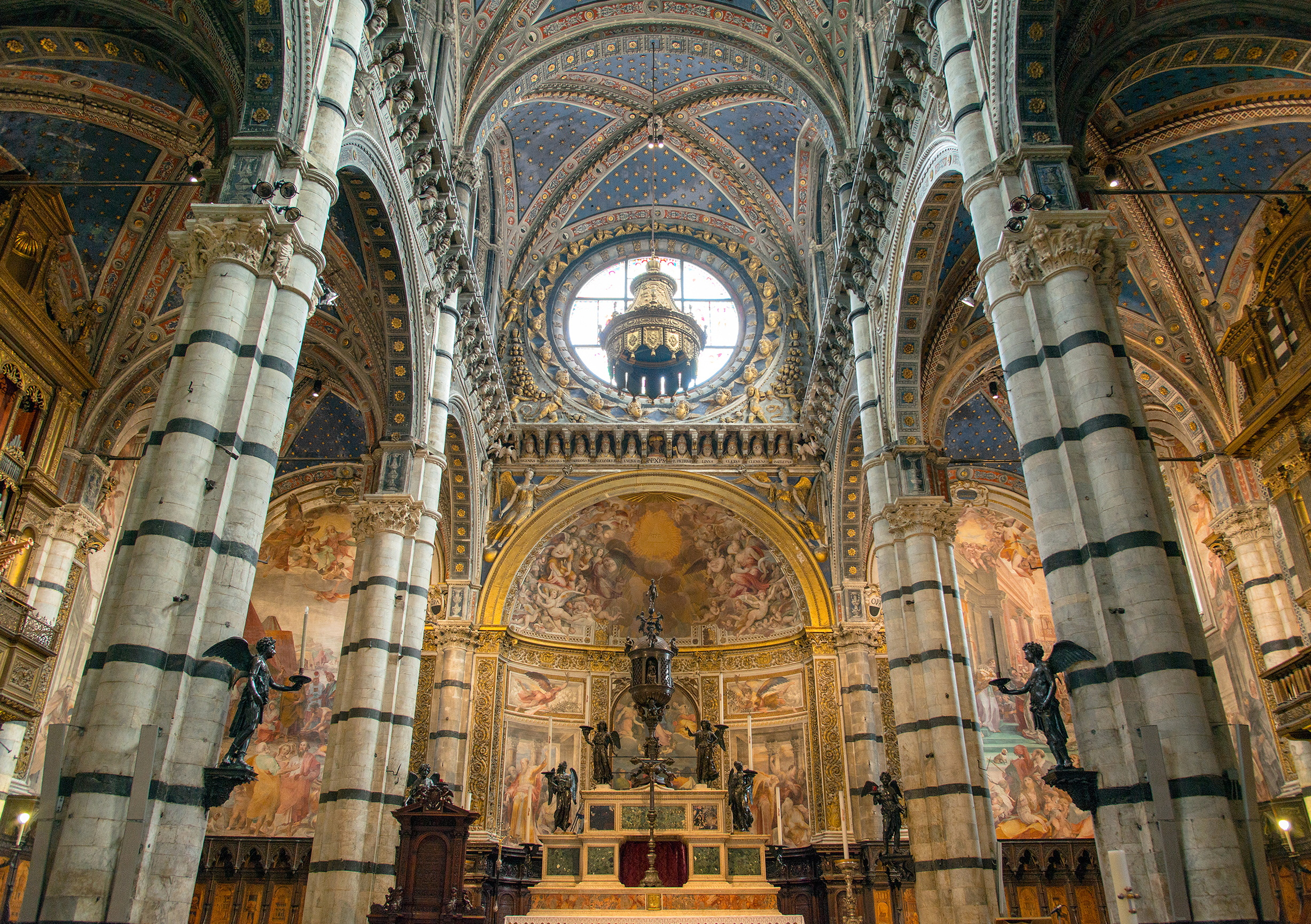
High altar by Baldassare Peruzzi (1532) and suspended Ciborium by Vecchietta

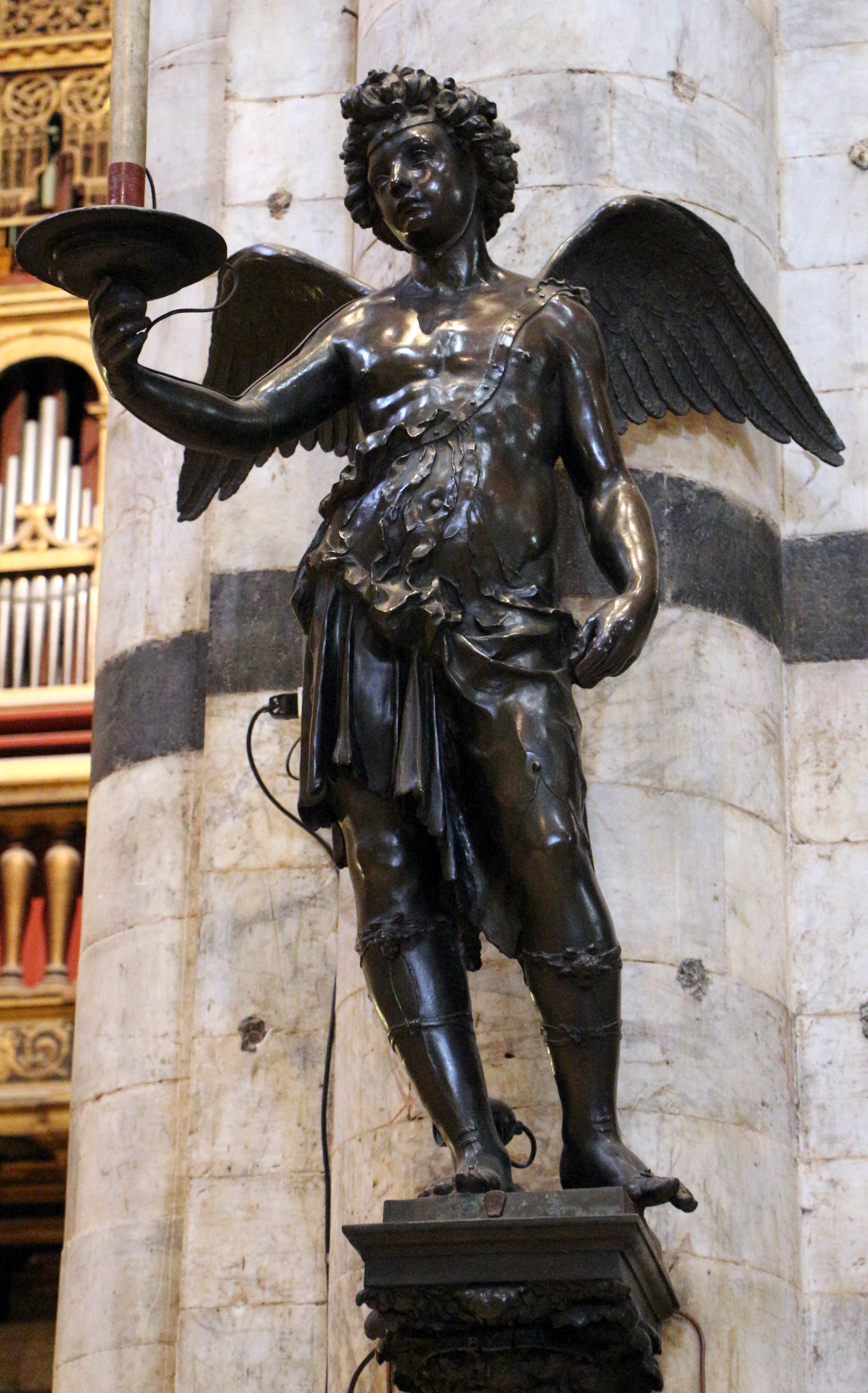
Bronze candlestick angel by Domenico Beccafumi, 1547-51

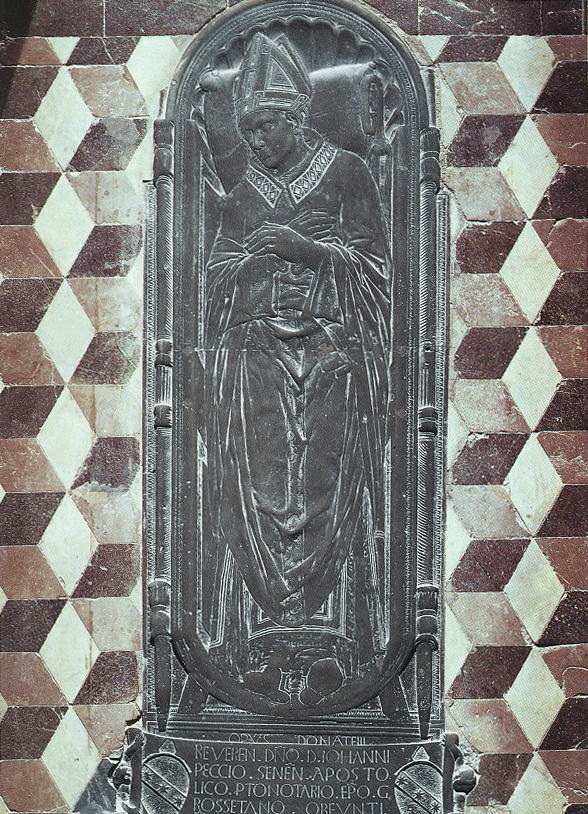
Donatello, Tomb slab of Giovanni Pecci, c. 1426

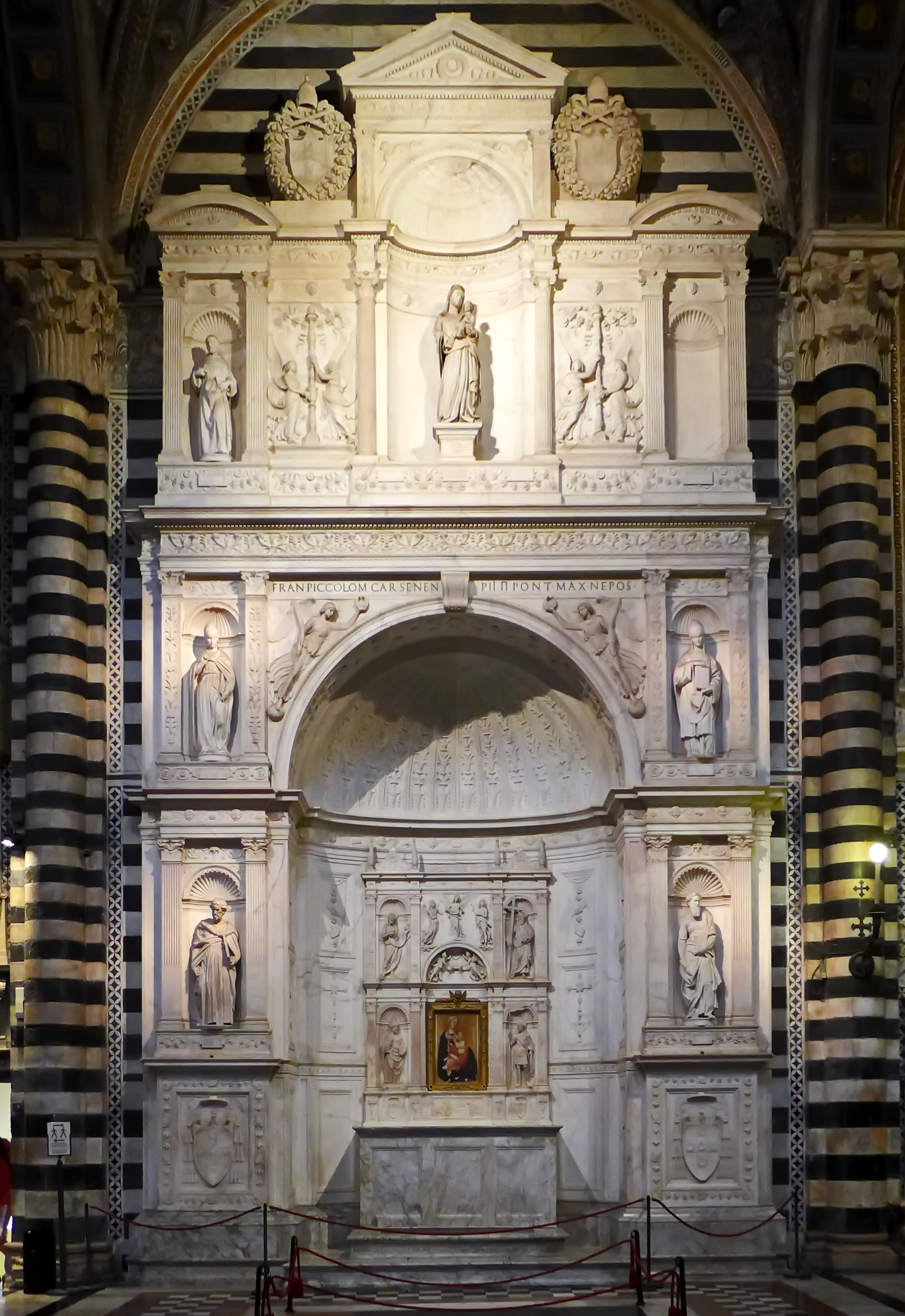
Piccolomini Altar by Andrea Bregno (1481–1485), with figures by Michelangelo (1504)

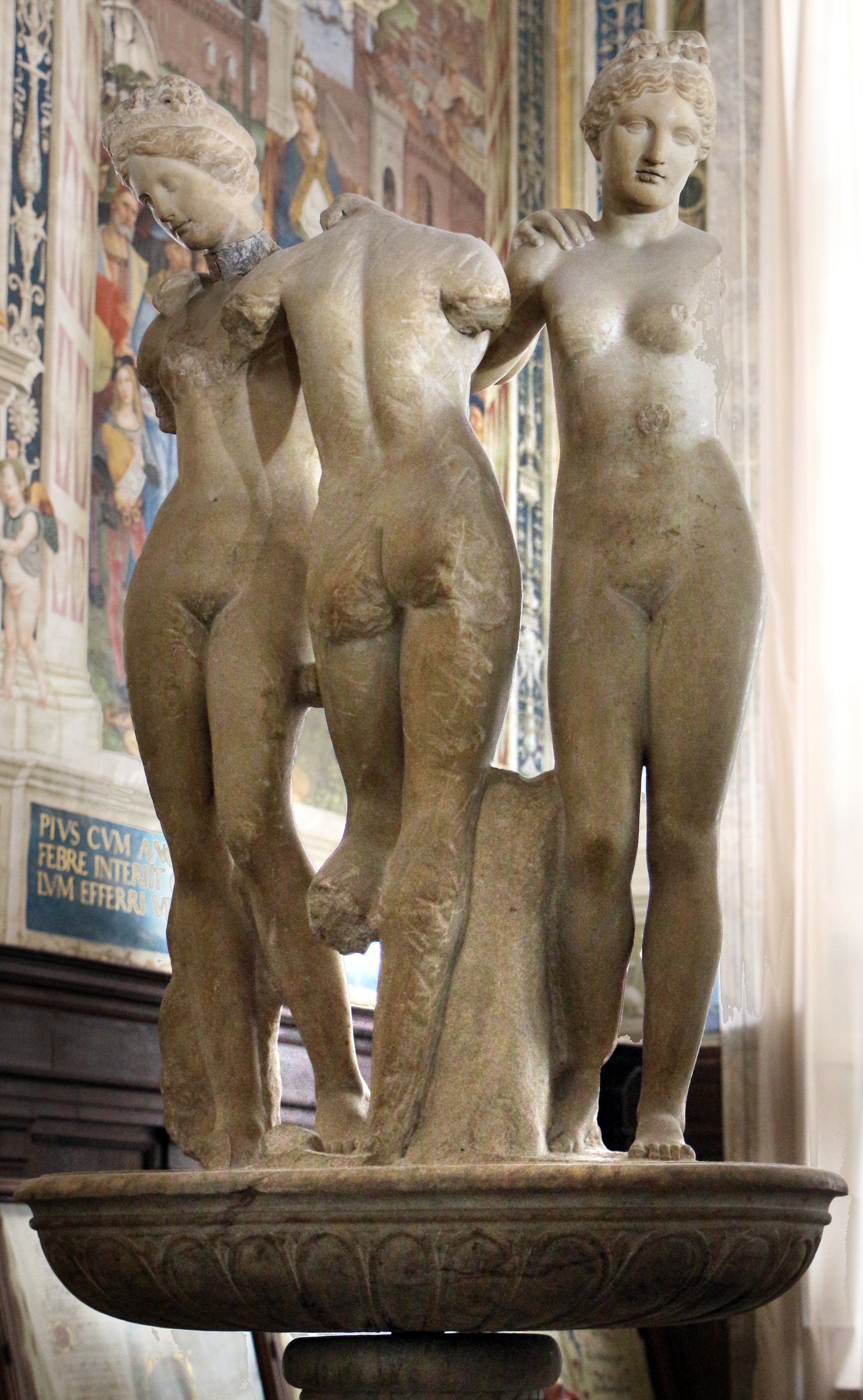
Piccolomini Library, The Three Graces, 3rd ct. Roman copy of a hellenistic original

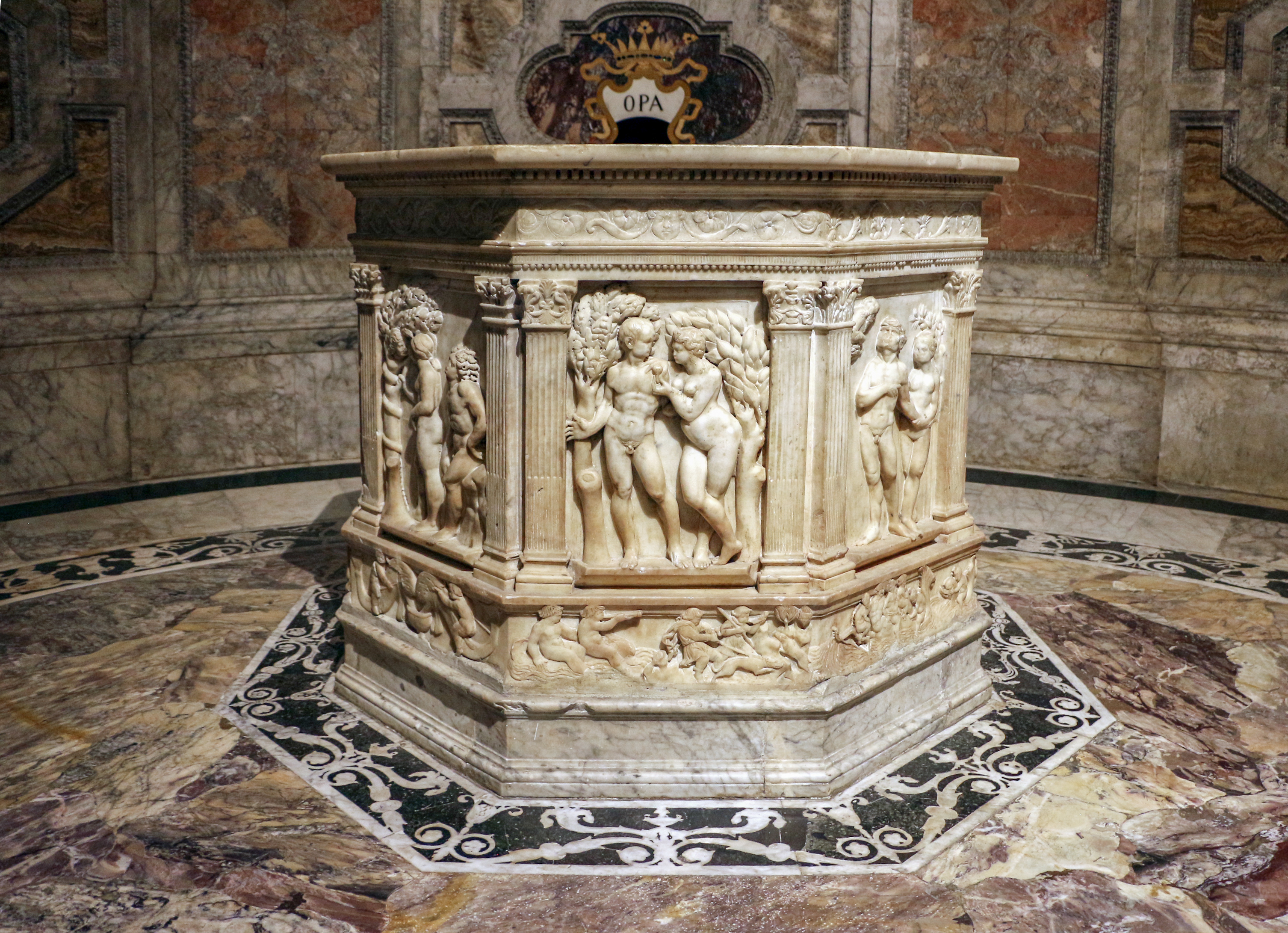
Baptistry, Baptismal Font by Antonio Federighi, 1465–1468
