= Giovanni Cristoforo Romano =

Italian sculptor and medallist (1456–1512)

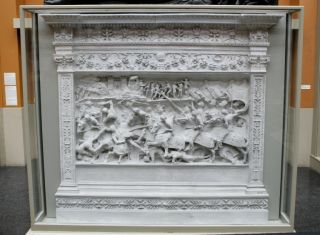
Plaster cast of a Battle scene by Gian Cristoforo Romano 1491-1497 (sculpted), ca. 1884 (cast) V&A Museum no. REPRO.1884-669

Giovanni Cristoforo (or Giancristoforo) Romano (1456–1512) was an Italian Renaissance sculptor and medallist.

Born in Rome to Isaia da Pisa, he was probably a pupil of Andrea Bregno. His first known works are in the Ducal Palace of Urbino, dating from before 1482. Later, he worked as a medallist for the courts of Ferrara and Mantua, where he was a favourite of duchess Isabella d'Este.

In 1491, he moved to Milan, called by Isabella's brother-in-law Ludovico Sforza, who commissioned him to execute the tomb of Gian Galeazzo Visconti at the Certosa di Pavia, which he executed in collaboration with Benedetto Briosco. After the fall of the Sforza (1499), he returned to work for Isabella d'Este, for which he executed some fine medals and the precious marble portal of her study in the Ducal Palace of Mantua.

Later, he sojourned in Rome (called by Pope Julius II), Naples, Cremona, and again Milan and Urbino.

The tripartite marble altar-piece in the Costa Chapel in Santa Maria del Popolo was probably created by him for Cardinal Jorge da Costa around 1505.

He died in 1512.
