= Giovanni di Stefano (sculptor) =

Italian sculptor

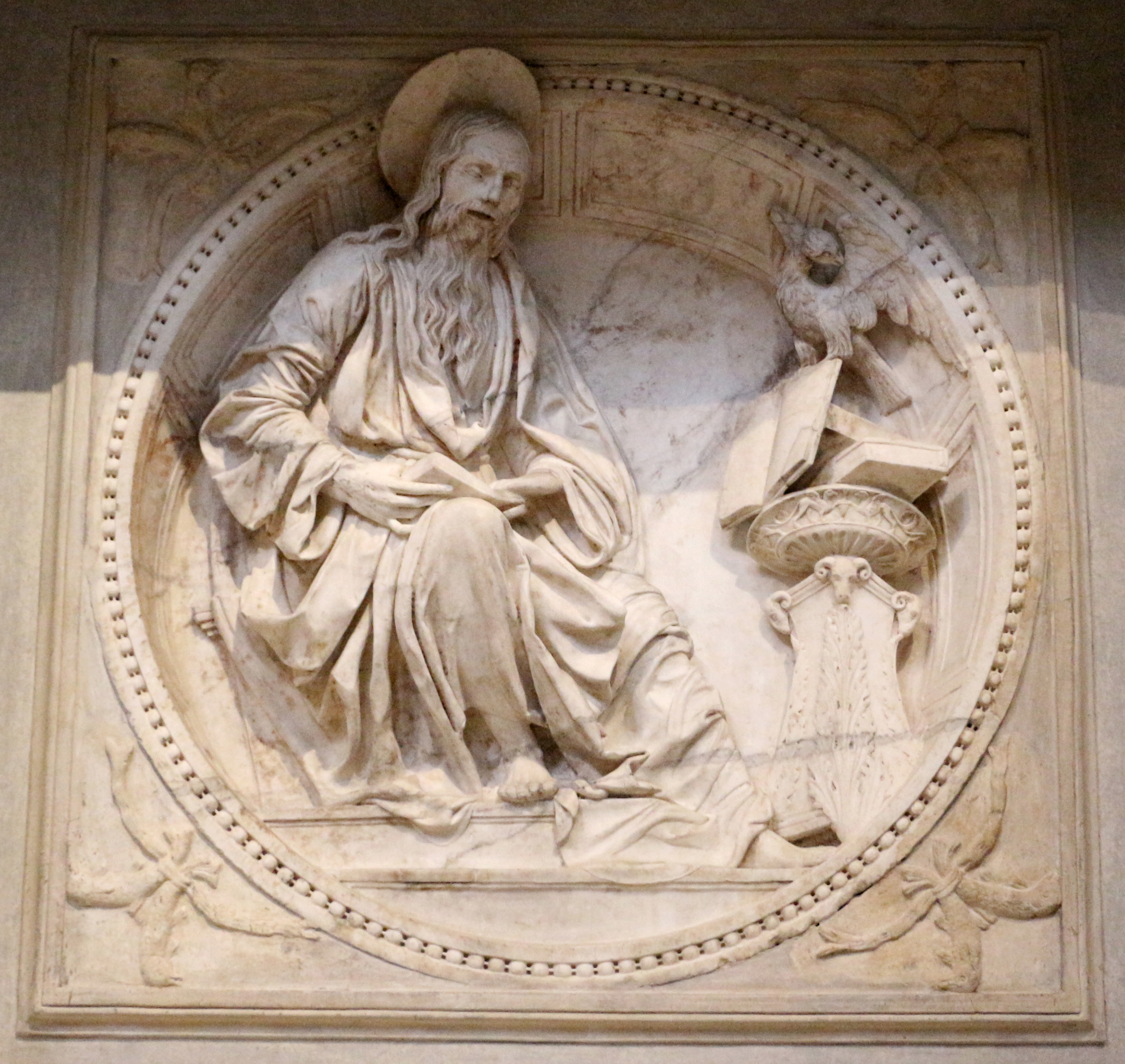
Saint John the Evangelist, Siena Cathedral, Entrance to Piccolomini Library

Giovanni di Stefano (1443 – c. 1506) was an Italian Renaissance sculptor, bronze-caster, and engineer. Baptized on 20 June 1443, he was the son of Stefano di Giovanni.

Some of his surviving works include two angels in bronze at Siena Cathedral, which he created in 1489 in collaboration with Francesco di Giorgio (who also worked with Giacomo Cozzarelli on another pair of bronze angels in the same cathedral), the marble altar of Saint Catherine's chapel in San Domenico, Siena (1469), and the effigy of Cardinal Pietro Foscari in the church of Santa Maria del Popolo in Rome (previously thought to have been created by Vecchietta), which he created c. 1485. The latter is now in the Costa Chapel.

Some scholars believe the bas relief of Saint John the Evangelist in Siena Cathedral to also be the work of Giovanni, but the evidence for this is disputed.
