= Pietro Foscari =

Italian Roman Catholic cardinal

Pietro Foscari (died 1485) (called the Cardinal of Venice) was an Italian Roman Catholic cardinal.

== Biography ==
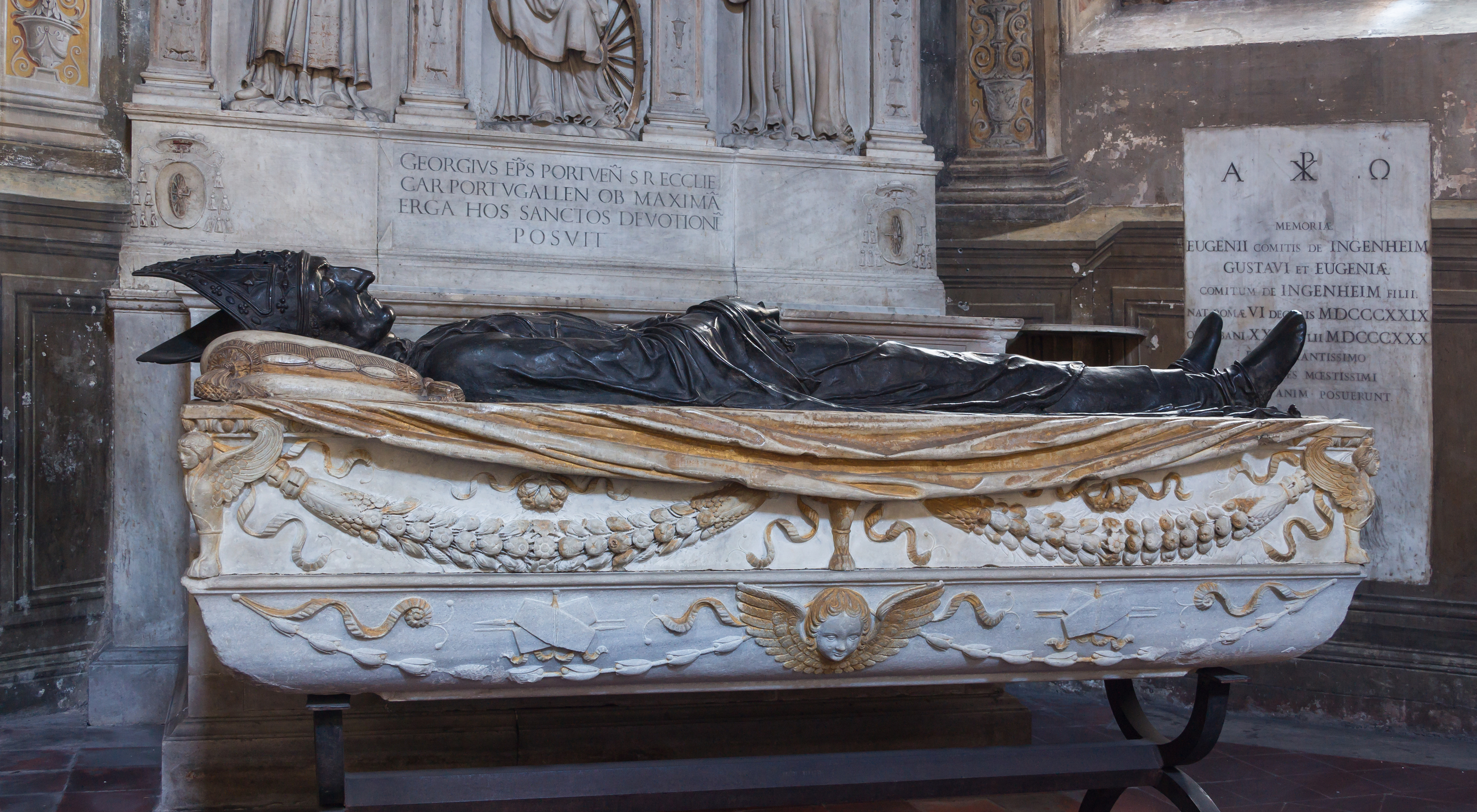
Tomb of cardinal Foscari, Costa Chapel, Santa Maria del Popolo

Pietro Foscari was born in Venice ca. 1417. He was the nephew of Francesco Foscari, Doge of Venice.

Early in his career he became Abbot of the monastery of Saints Cosmas and Damian in Zara. In 1448, he became a canon of the cathedral chapter of Padua Cathedral. He became primicerius of St Mark's Basilica in Venice in 1452. He later became a protonotary apostolic.

In the secret consistory of 25 March 1471 Pope Paul II secretly made Foscari a cardinal, but this was not published before the pope's death on July 26 and he was therefore not admitted to the papal conclave of 1471 that elected Pope Sixtus IV. In the consistory of 10 December 1477 Pope Sixtus IV made Foscari a cardinal priest; this was published on 20 December and Foscari given the titular church of San Nicola fra le Immagini. He arrived in Rome on 12 March 1478 and received the red hat on 6 April 1478.

In April 1478 he was named apostolic administrator of the metropolitan see of Spalato, a post he occupied until 17 September 1479. On 13 April 1481 he was named apostolic administrator of the see of Padua and occupied that post until his death. He left Rome for Padua on 18 June 1481 and returned to Rome on 25 May 1483.

He participated in the papal conclave of 1484 that elected Pope Innocent VIII.

He died at the Baths of Bacucco Viterbo near Viterbo on 11 August 1485. His bronze and marble tomb by Giovanni di Stefano is preserved in the Costa Chapel, Santa Maria del Popolo.
