= Della Rovere Chapel =

Chapel in the church of Santa Maria del Popolo, Rome

- Capella della Rovere
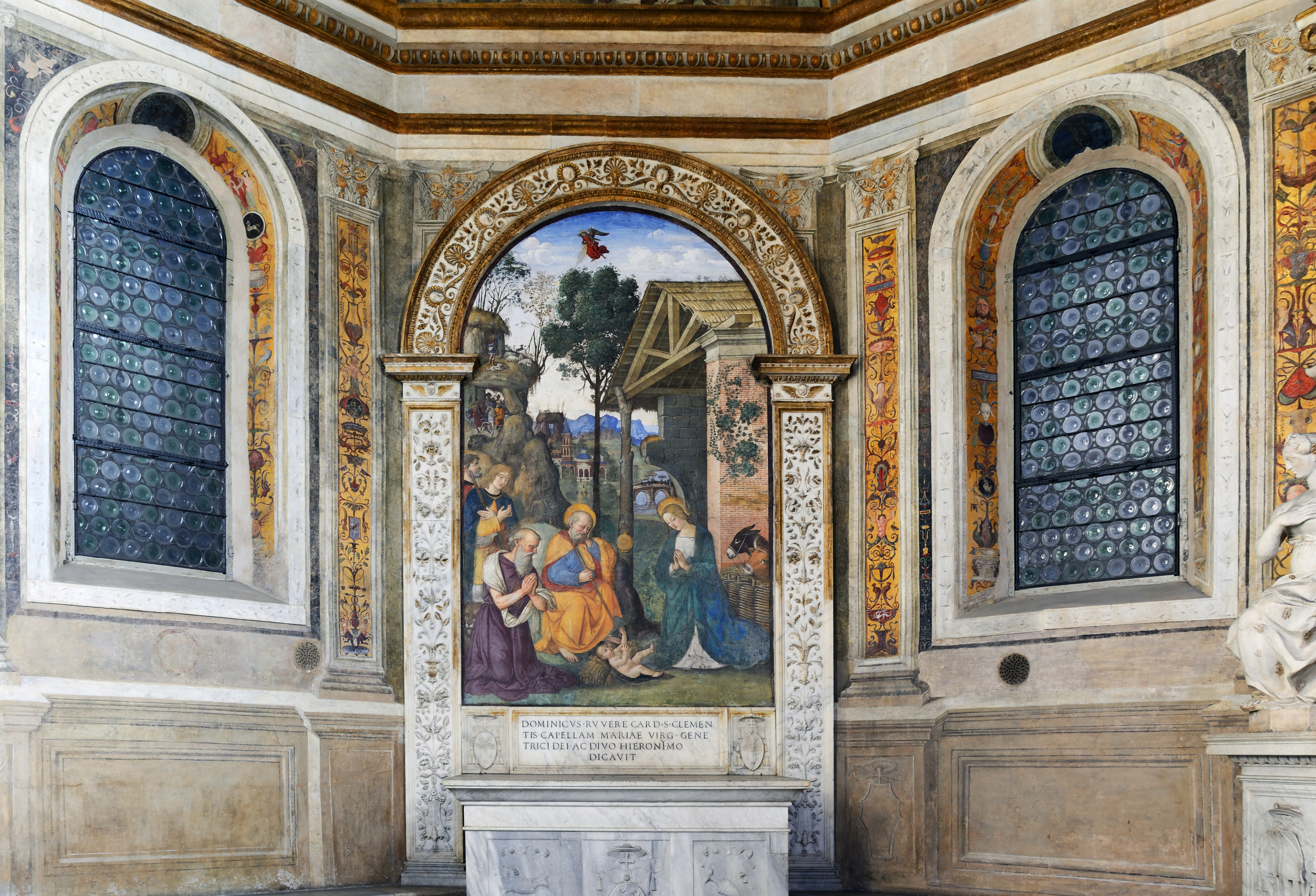
- Pinturicchio’s frescoes in the chapel
- Della Rovere Chapel
- Location: Santa Maria del Popolo, Rome
- Country: Italy
- Denomination: Catholic

History
- Status: Chapel
- Founder: Domenico della Rovere
- Dedication: Saint Jerome

Architecture
- Functional status: Active
- Architect: Andrea Bregno (attributed)
- Architectural type: Chapel
- Style: Renaissance
- Completed: c. 1477–1483

Specifications
- Materials: Marble, fresco

Administration
- Diocese: Rome
- Parish: Santa Maria in Popolo

The Della Rovere or Saint Jerome Chapel, otherwise the Chapel of the Nativity (Italian: Cappella del Presepio or Cappella di San Girolamo) is the first side chapel in the south aisle of the Basilica of Santa Maria del Popolo in Rome. It was dedicated to the Virgin and Saint Jerome and decorated with the paintings of Pinturicchio and his pupils. It is one of the best preserved monuments of quattrocento art in Rome.

== History ==
The chapel was bought by Cardinal Domenico della Rovere in 1477 after the reconstruction of the church by his relative, Pope Sixtus IV. The interior of the chapel with the tomb of Cardinal Cristoforo della Rovere (†1478), the marble altar and the pictorial decoration was executed in the following years. The frescoes are attributed to Pinturicchio and his school. According to the traditional dating he worked in the chapel from 1488 to 1490, at the same time when he created the frescoes of Palazzo Della Rovere (now Palazzo dei Penitenzieri) for the cardinal.

Other studies, for example those of Strinati (1995), have proposed an earlier date, before the Bufalini Chapel in Santa Maria in Aracoeli, oscillating between the 1470s and 1482, supported by the dedicatory epigraph of the cardinal that does not report his title of archbishop of Turin which he only got in that year.

The chapel changed little during the centuries but suffered an important alteration when the tomb of Giovanni da Castro was moved here from its original place on the counterfaçade. This happened during the general reconstruction of the basilica by Pope Alexander VII in 1655–61. The original painted decoration of the fifth wall is hidden behind the large monument.

== Description ==
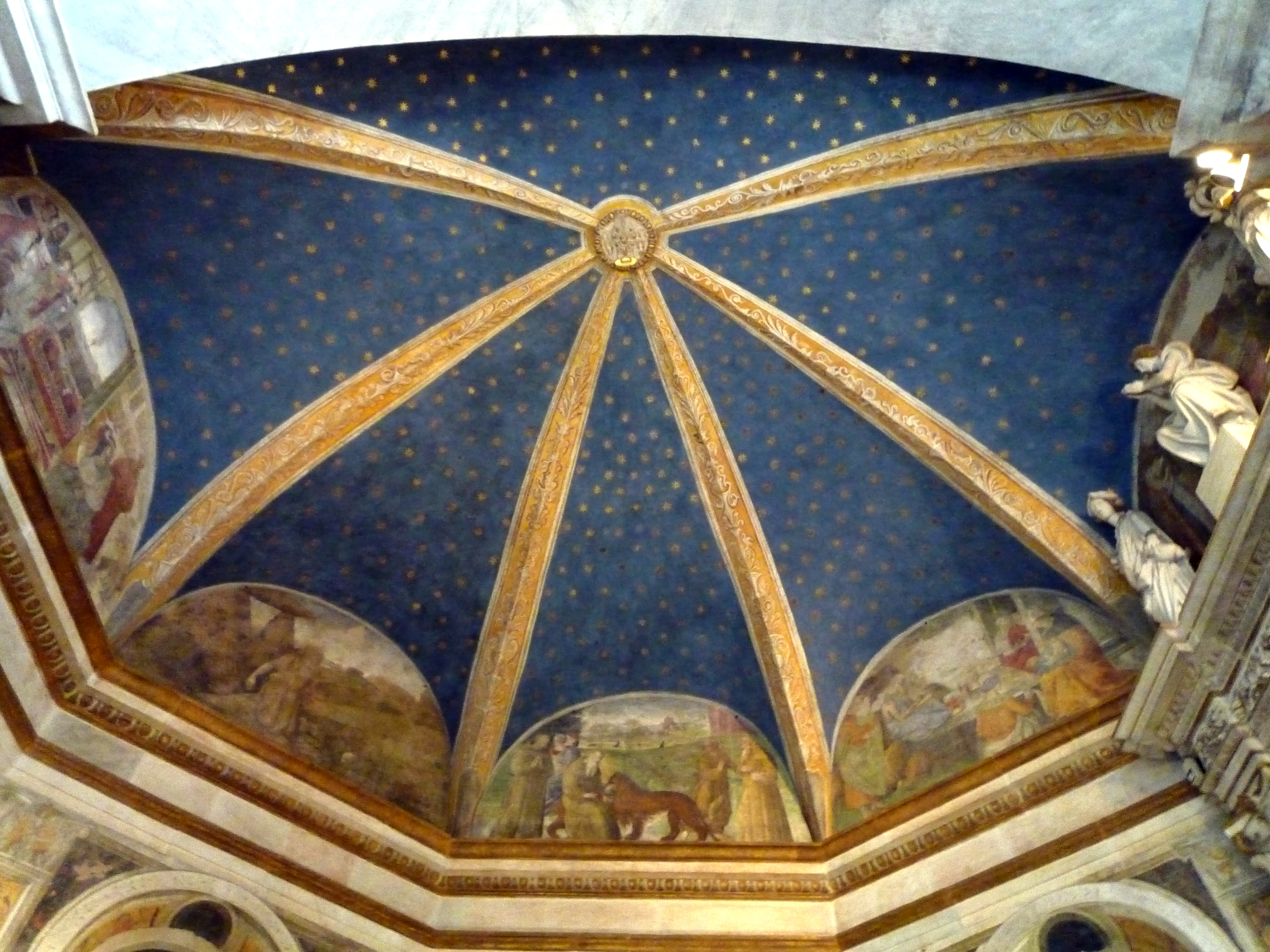
Late Gothic ribbed vault

The chapel is hexagonal with a sexpartite ribbed vault. The side walls are articulated by painted Corinthian pilasters decorated with grotesques, resting on a monochrome base. The ribs and the splays of the two arched windows are decorated with similar grotesques. The main altar-piece, The Adoration of the Child with St. Jerome is an exquisite autograph work by Pinturicchio. The marble slabs of the parapet are decorated with Cardinal Della Rovere's coat-of-arms held by two putti. The entrance arch is supported by travertine half-columns which are similar to other original half-columns of the basilica. They have Corinthianesque capitals with a palmette motif between the scrolls and they were painted gold (these are the only capitals in the basilica without a later plaster coat).

The polychrome grotesques on yellow-gold background are of the highest quality and were enhanced by a cleaning in the 1990s. The rich repertoire of figures contain masks, swans, camels, shells, musical instruments etc. They were painted by a pictor doctus with an ease comparable to the artists of the imperial era. They are therefore ascribed to the hand of the master who put into practice a bold experiment, one of the most successful of its kind.

La Malfa claims that the grotesques on the pilasters were clearly inspired by those painted in the Domus Aurea (the so-called Room of Achilles on Skyros) and the wall decoration was executed no later than 1479, that is before the building of the tomb of Cristoforo Della Rovere. In this case they could be among the earliest of their kind in Rome.

=== Vault and lunettes ===
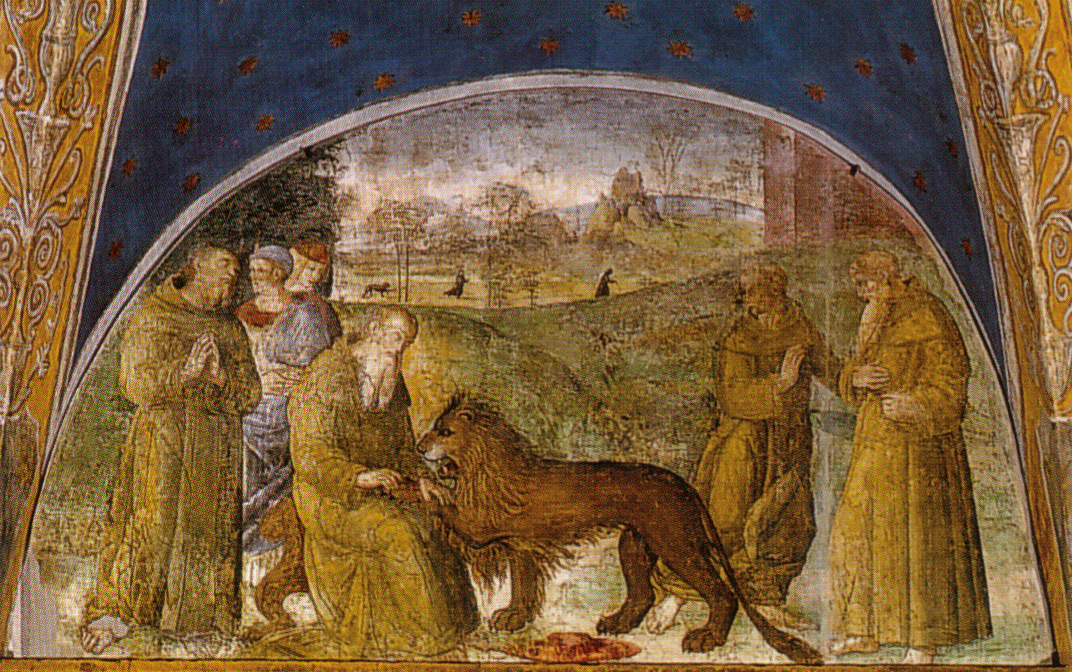
St Jerome extracting a thorn from a lion's paw

The vault was decorated with delicate all'antica motifs before being covered with a blue carpet and gold stars due to its bad state. There are five frescoes in the lunettes from the Life of St. Jerome, detached and transferred to canvas in the 18th century. The scenes are:

- St Jerome debating the perpetual virginity of Mary with the heretic Helvidius
- St Jerome in the desert
- St Jerome extracting a thorn from a lion's paw
- St Jerome in his study with St Augustine
- St Jerome's death

The latter was hidden behind the monument of Giovanni de Castro, placed there in the 17th century, and was discovered only recently: perhaps this is the portrait of Cardinal Della Rovere mentioned by Giorgio Vasari.

The lunette paintings are worn and only their general compositional structure could be appreciated which according to Strinati was influenced by the Roman painters of the era: Piermatteo d'Amelia and Antoniazzo Romano. Some deny the authenticity of the lunettes attributing them to the assistant Tiberio d'Assisi. The paintings were originally richly gilded as evidenced by the presence of red wax on the edges of the garments that served as a support for the leaves of precious metal.

=== The Adoration of the Child ===
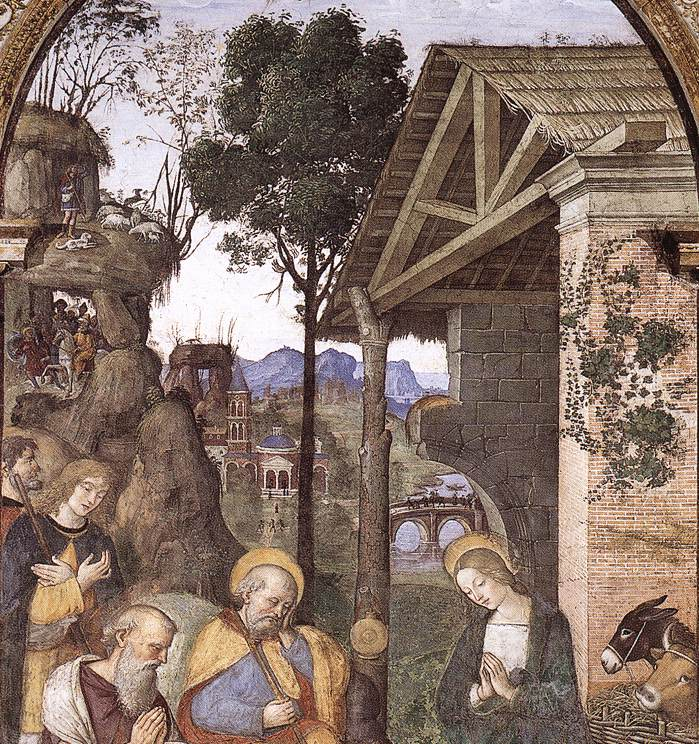
The Adoration of the Child (detail)

The Adoration of the Child with St. Jerome is located above the main altar, framed by a carved and gilded marble arch. It was always referred to as an autograph work by Pinturicchio whose master workmanship was confirmed during the restoration. In front of the hut of the Nativity, partially ruined and its walls built of different materials (symbolizing the Jewish and pagan religions which predated the rise of Christianity), and with a truss roof seen from underneath, the Holy Family is seen together with St. Jerome and the shepherds adoring the Child. Jesus is resting on a bundle of wheat, reference to the bread of the Eucharist. To the right the ox and the donkey are penned behind a fence of woven twigs while Joseph is represented in a typical dormant posture alluding to his role as a mere guardian of Mary and Jesus without active participation in the procreation. The rich background fades in the distance according to the rules of perspective which makes things appear distantly blurred in bluish colours through the effect of haze; it is populated by a city on the banks of a lake and a series of fantastic rocky spurs, creating an atmospheric setting for the procession of the Magi and the angelic announcement to the shepherds, located at the top center. In the middle an extremely slender tree acts as a pivot for the background and separates the two parts, re-creating equilibrium.

The most beautiful pictorial details are the heads of Mary and the Child; the vivacity of looks and gestures recalls the Adoration of Antoniazzo Romano.

The dedication plaque for the chapel is set at the centre of the base between two Della Rovere coat-of-arms with the cardinal's hat:

DOMINICVS RVVERE CARD[INALI]S S[ANCTIS] CLEMENTIS CAPPELLA MARIAE VIRG[INIS] GENETRICI DEI AC DIVO HIERONIMO DICAVIT.

Domenico della Rovere, the cardinal of San Clemente dedicated this chapel to the Virgin Mary, mother of God, and St. Jerome

=== Sculptures ===
The tomb of Cardinal Cristoforo della Rovere, the Bishop of Tarentaise (died in 1478) is one of the best 15th century sculpted funeral monuments in Rome. It is the work of Andrea Bregno but the relief of the Virgin and the Child in the lunette is attributed to Mino da Fiesole. According to the inscription the tomb was prepared by Domenico della Rovere for his brother and himself (c. 1479). The funeral monument of Jorge da Costa in the Costa Chapel shows a strong similarity to this tomb.

The other tomb in the chapel is the sepulchre of Cardinal Juan de Castro who died in 1506. Francesco Sangallo's 16th century work is sometimes compared unfavourably to the superb Della Rovere monument: "With its restless flaunting angels, its pretentious ornament, its self-conscious Virtues, its total lack of quiet repose and thoughtfulness, has in it all the elements of the decay which was to overtake Italian sculpture before the century went out."

The tombstone of the Venuta family is set in the pavement. The slab is decorated with the family coat-of-arms (two maces crossed), and has a Renaissance frame with floral engravings.

== Gallery ==
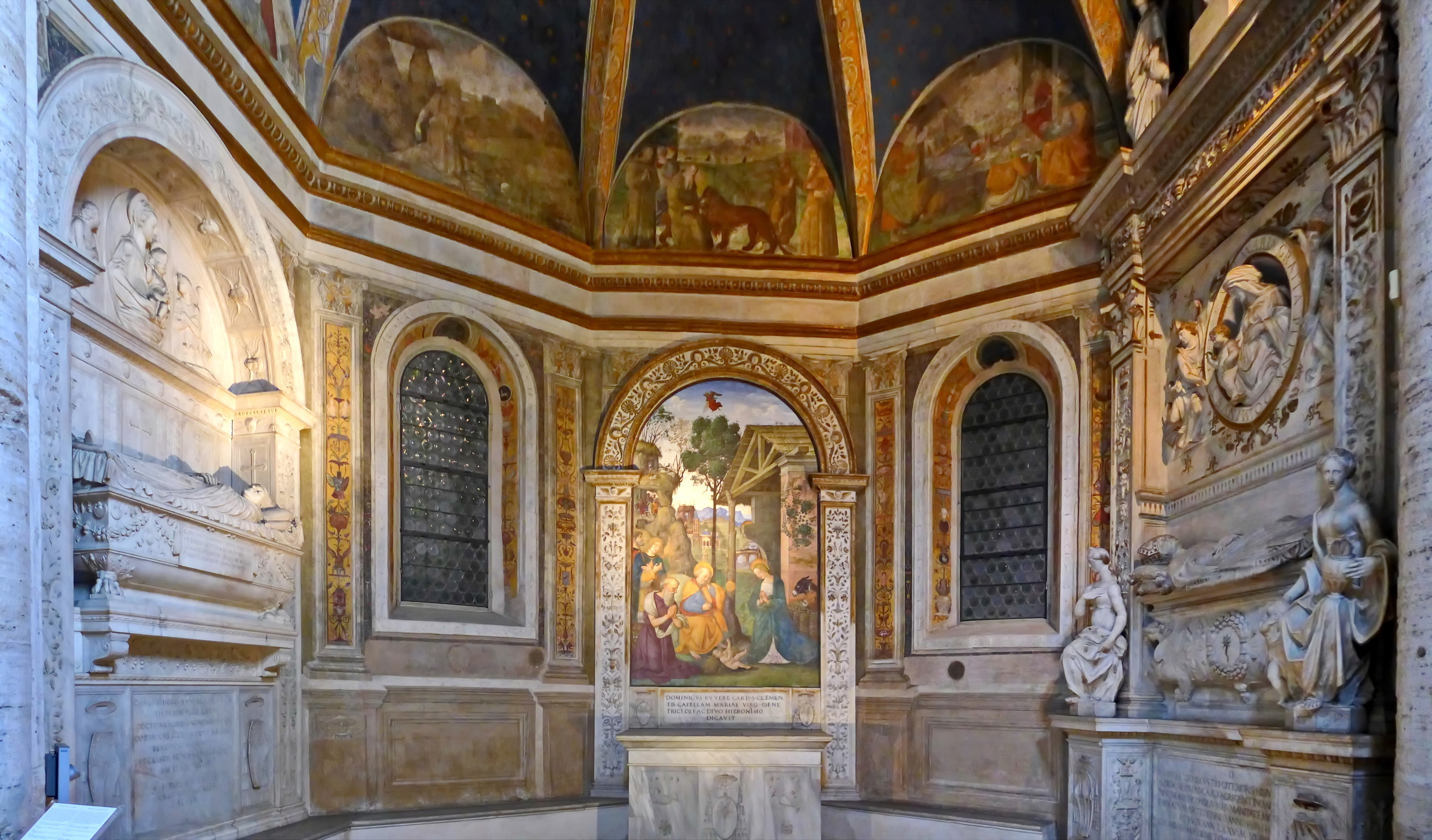
General view with the altar and the tombs

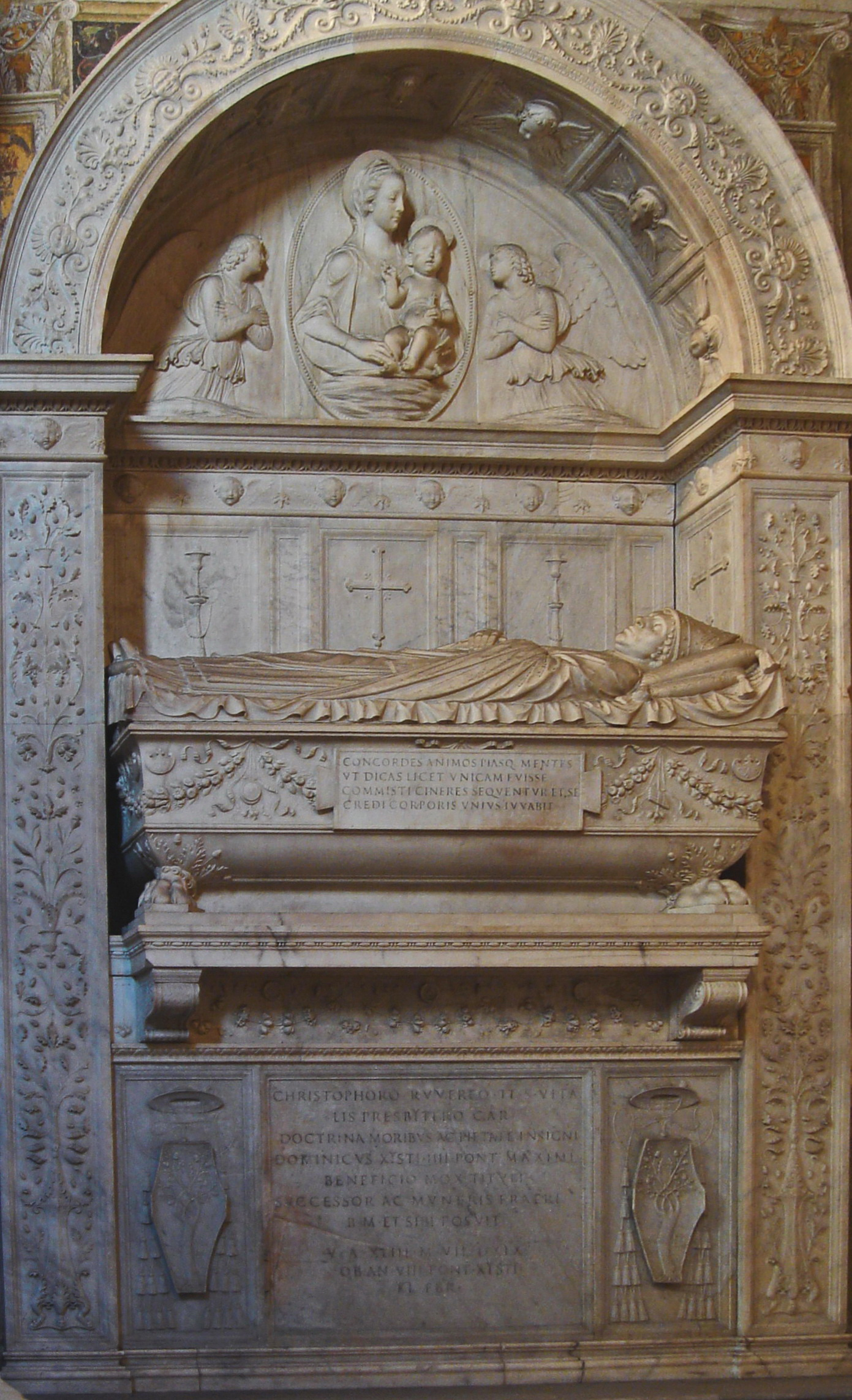
The tomb of Cardinal Cristoforo della Rovere by Andrea Bregno and Mino da Fiesole

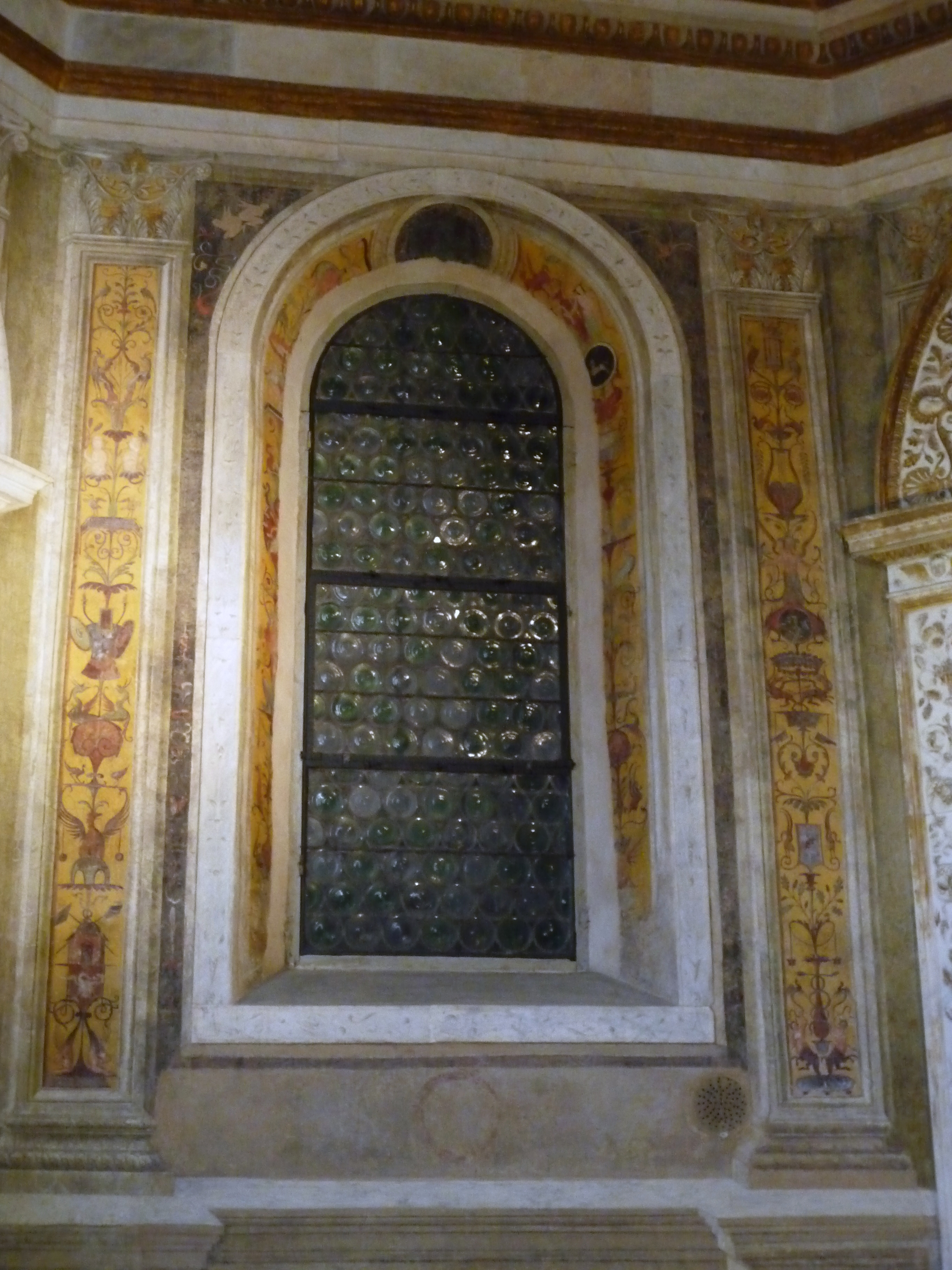
Painted grotesque decoration by the school of Pinturicchio

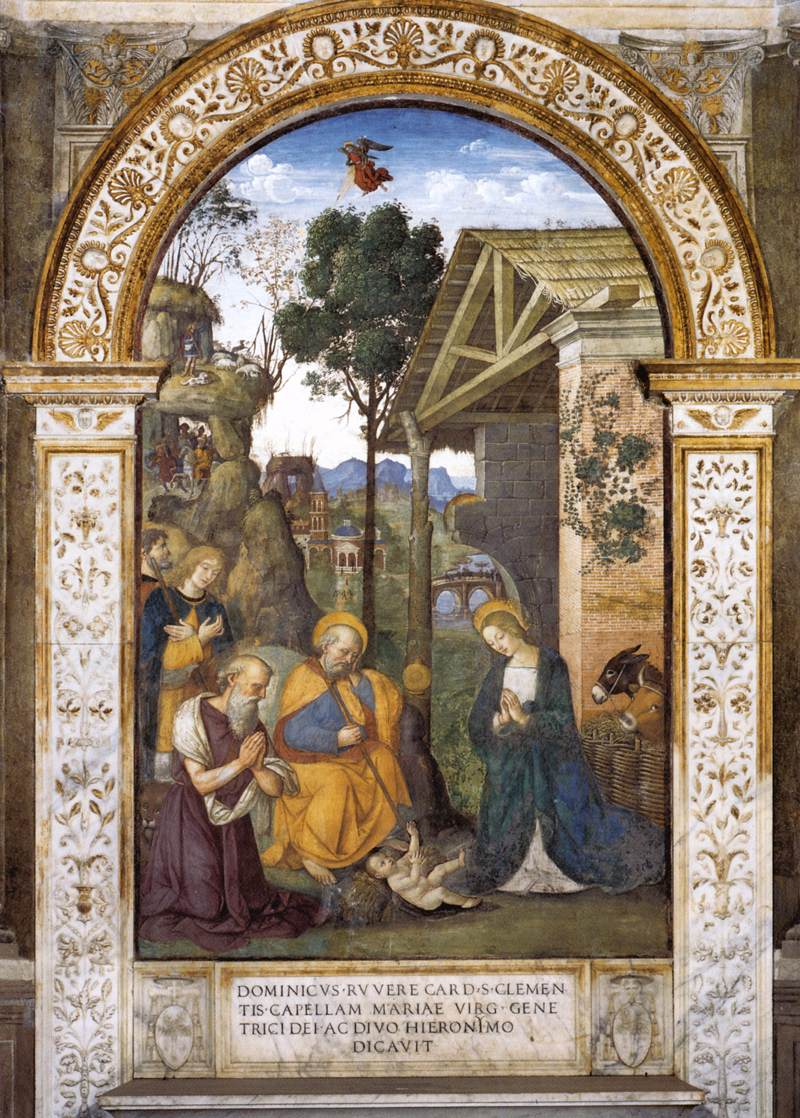
The Adoration of the Child with St. Jerome by Pinturicchio

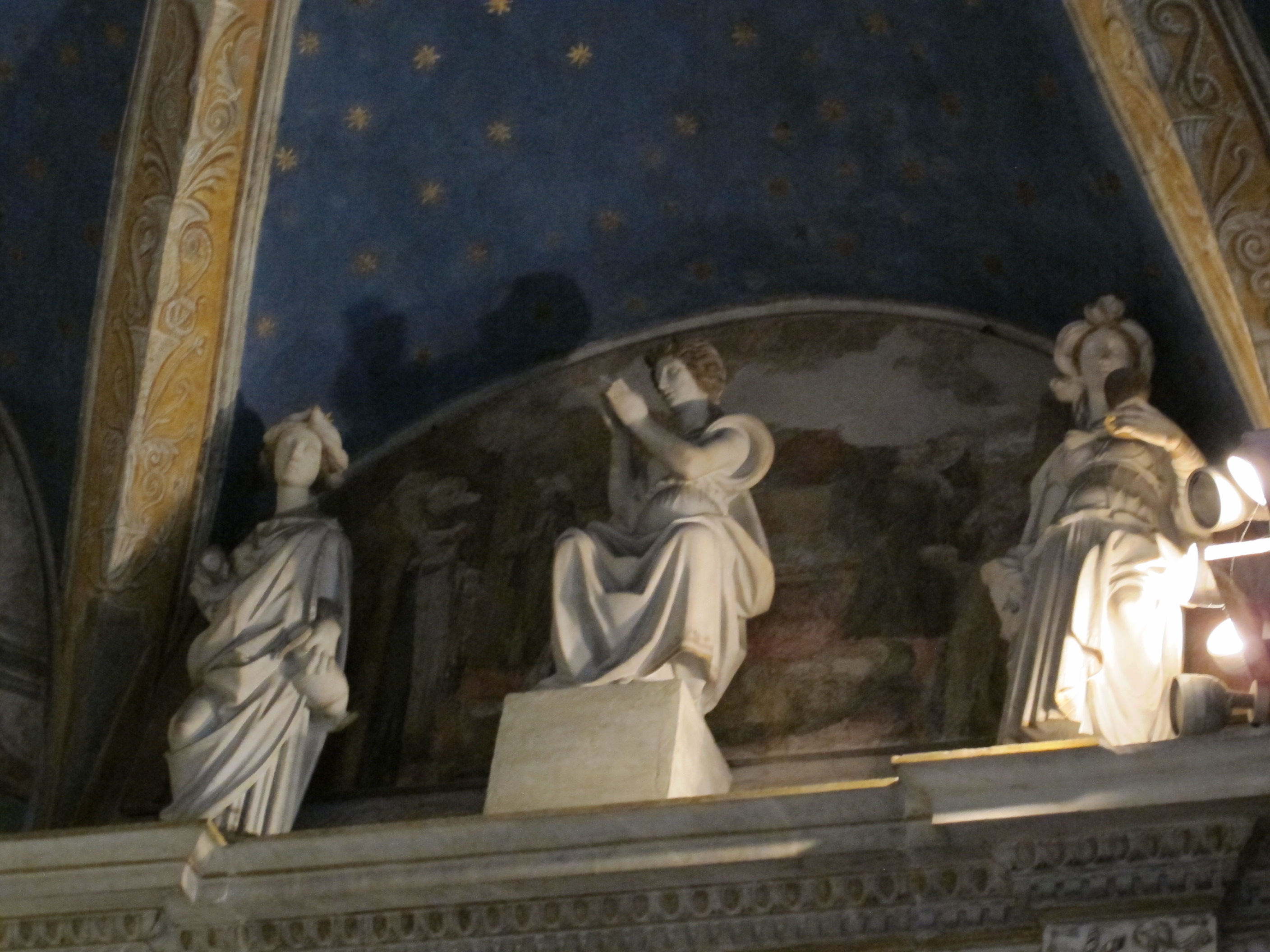
Funeral monument of Giovanni da Castro (detail)

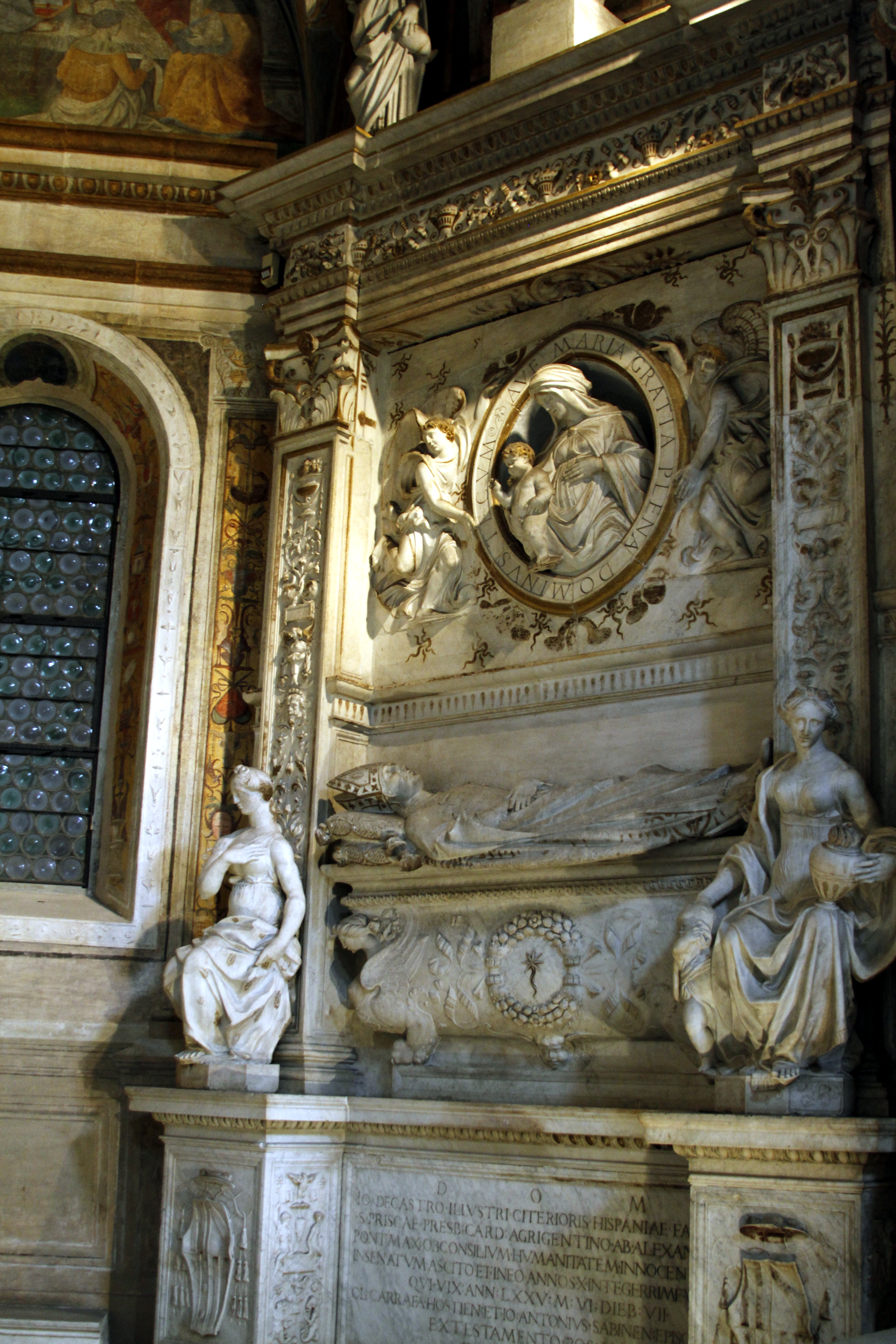
Funeral monument of Giovanni da Castro by Francesco da Sangallo

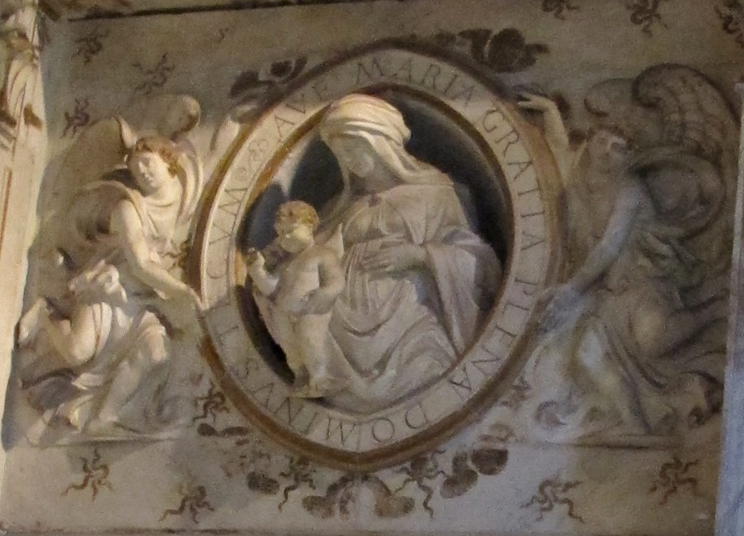
Funeral monument of Giovanni da Castro (detail)

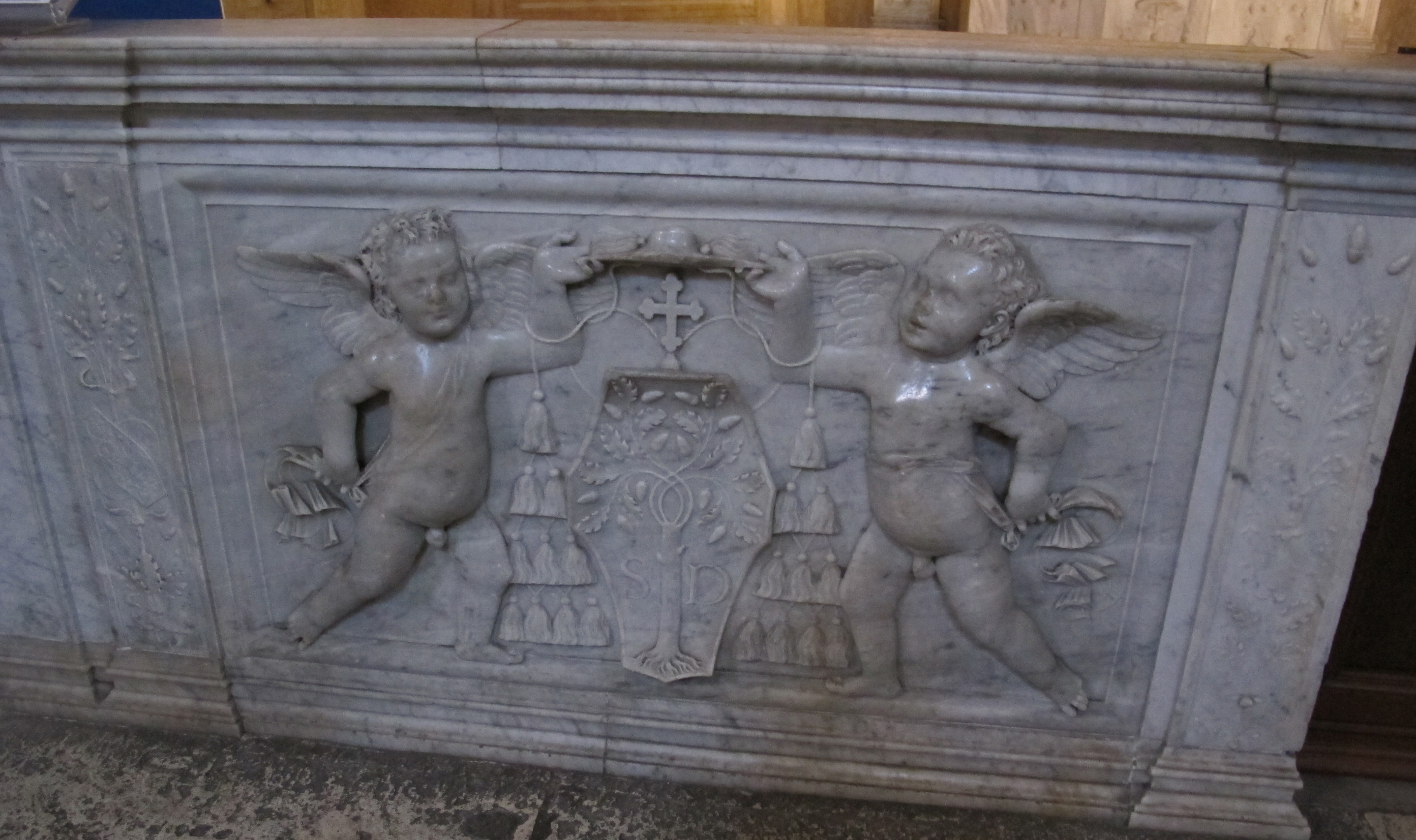
Baluster with Della Rovere coat-of-arms

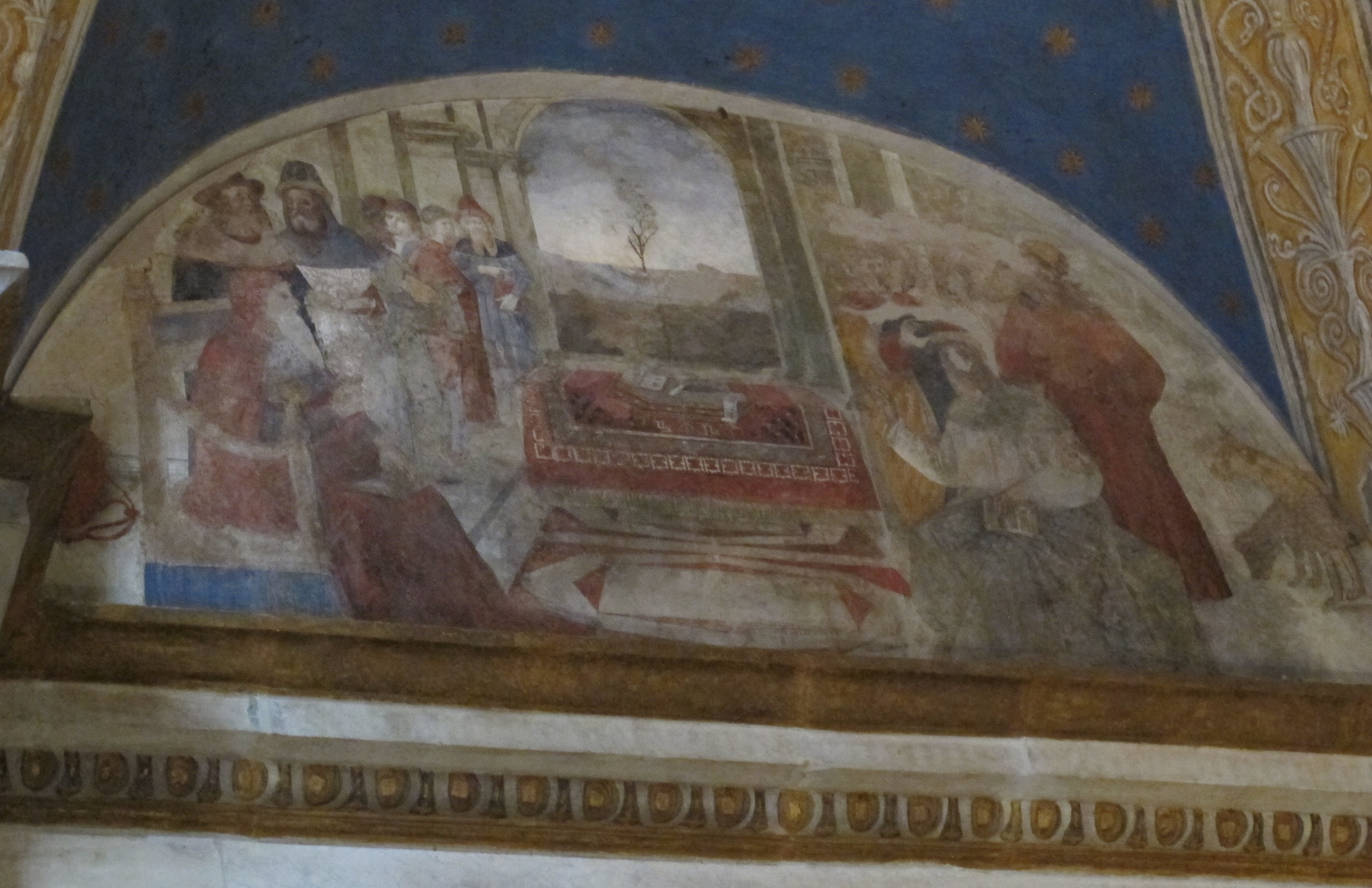
St Jerome debating the perpetual virginity of Mary with the heretic Helvidius (lunette)

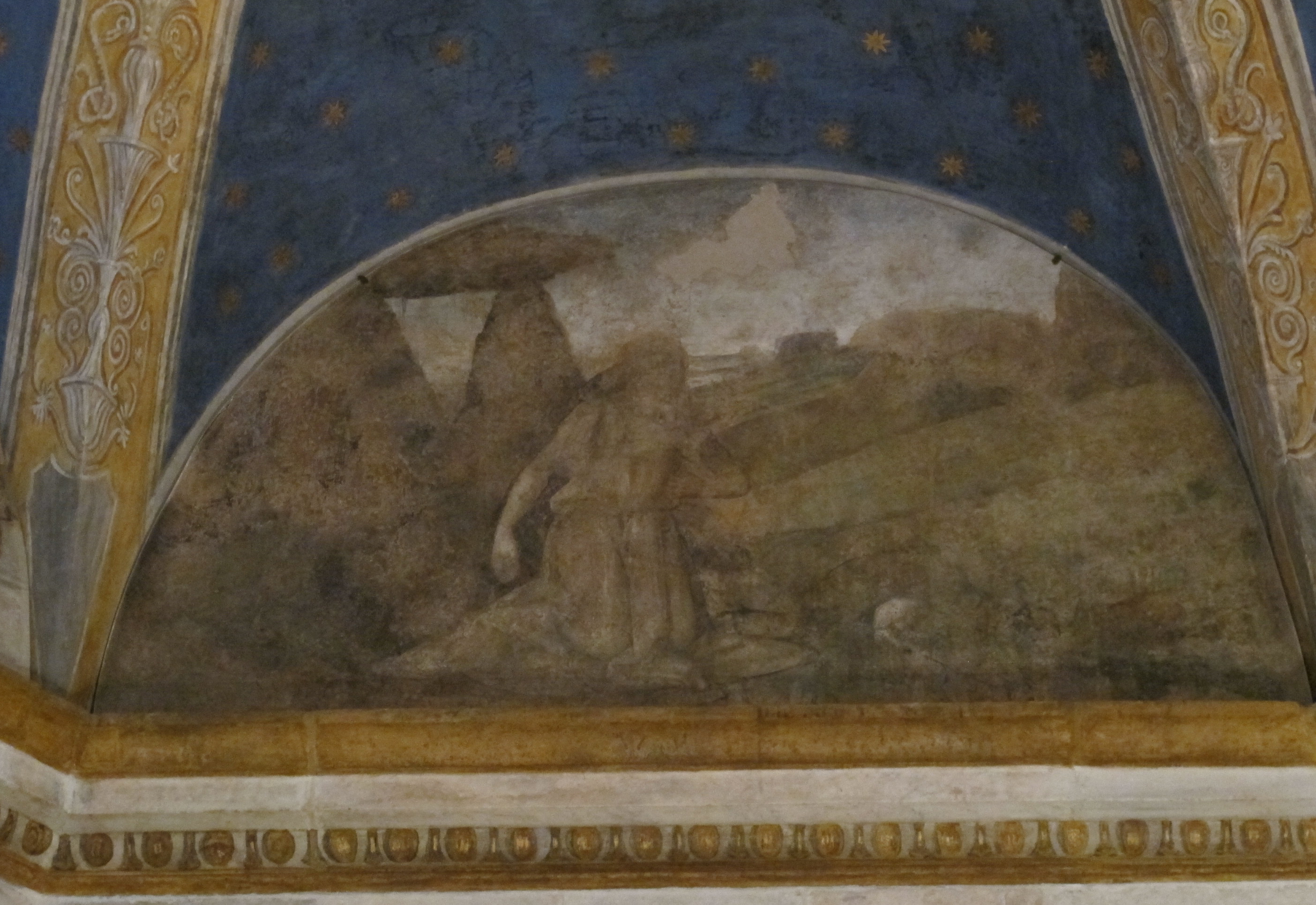
St Jerome in the desert (lunette)

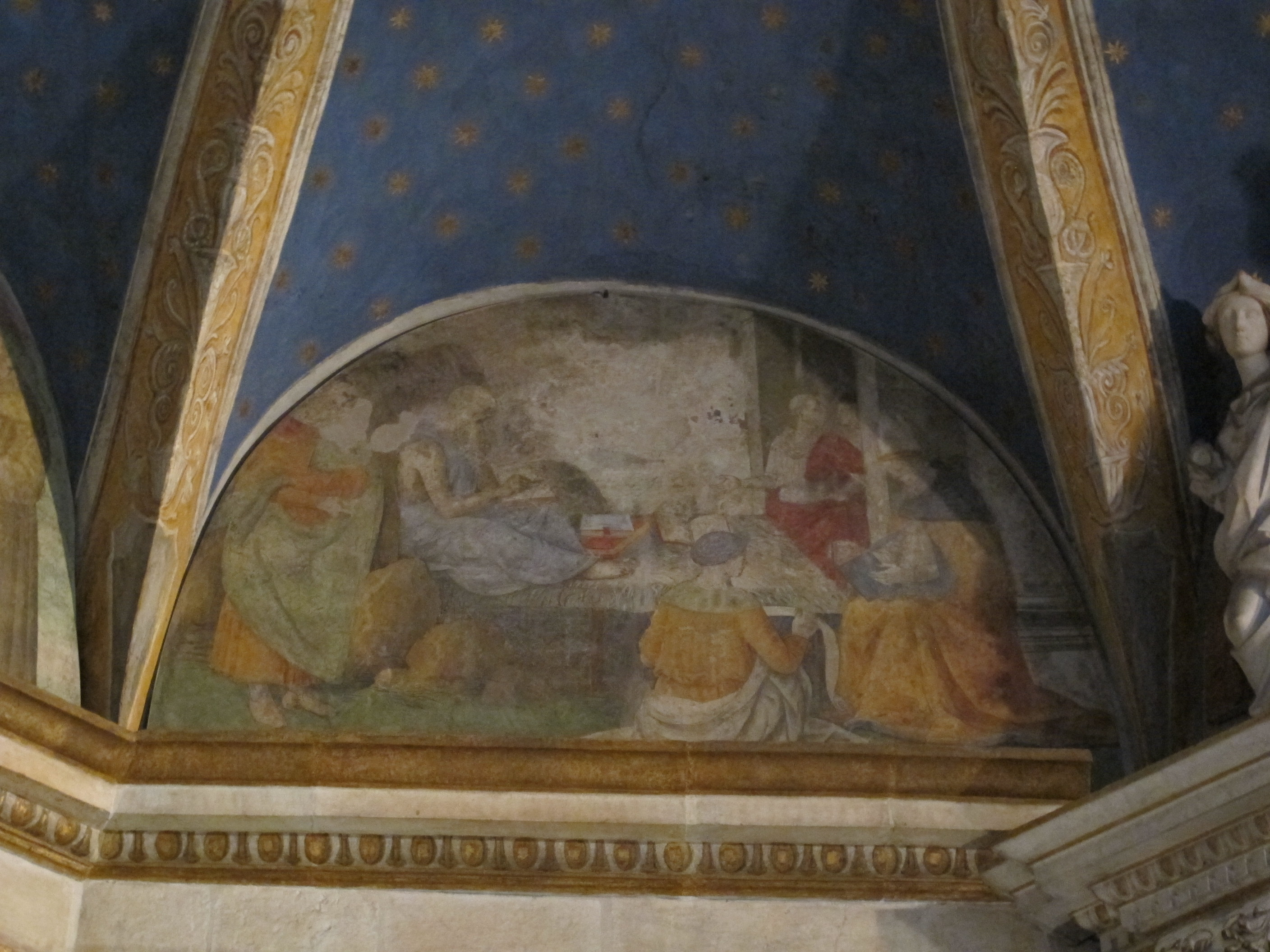
St Jerome in his study with St Augustine (lunette)

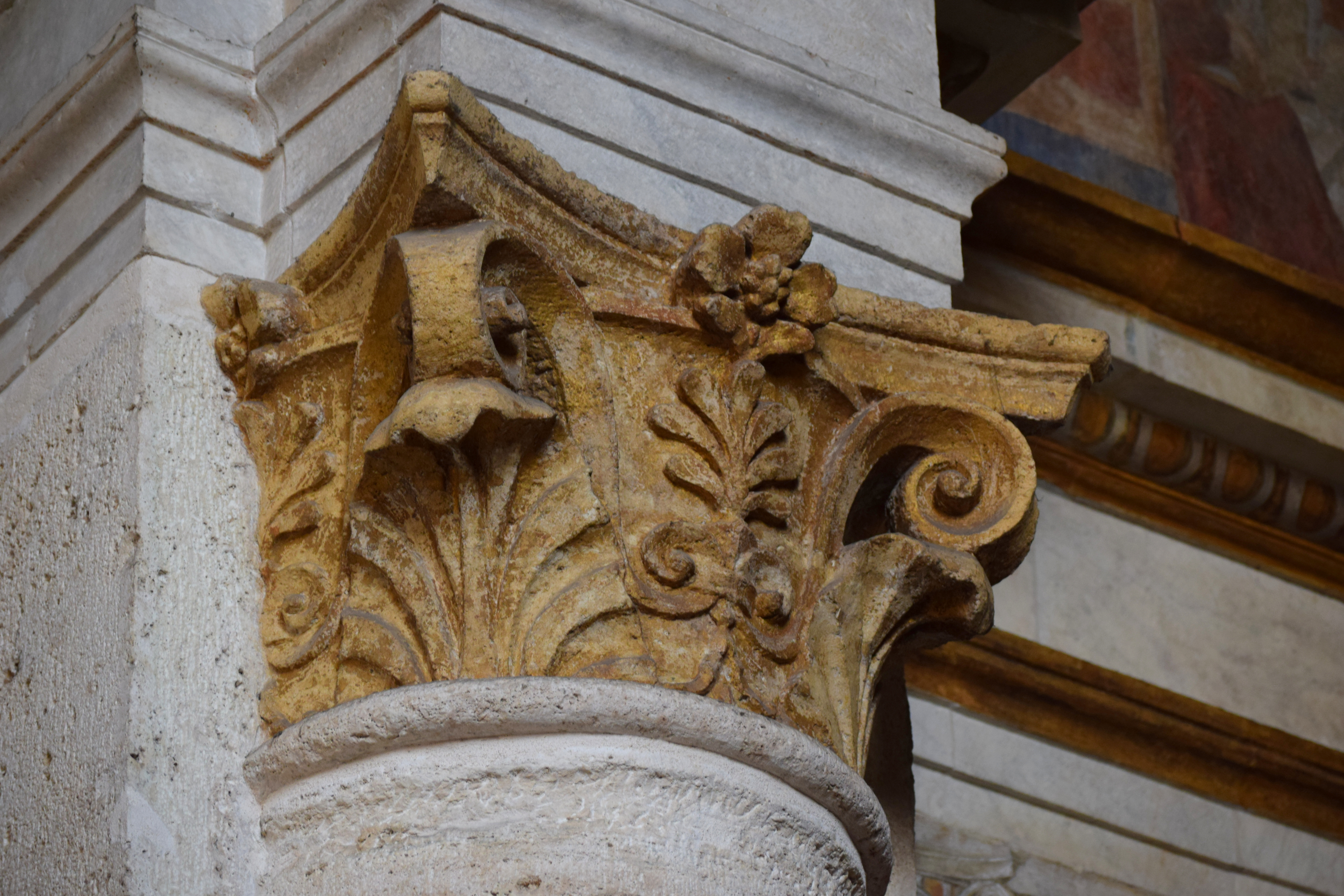
Corinthianesque capital

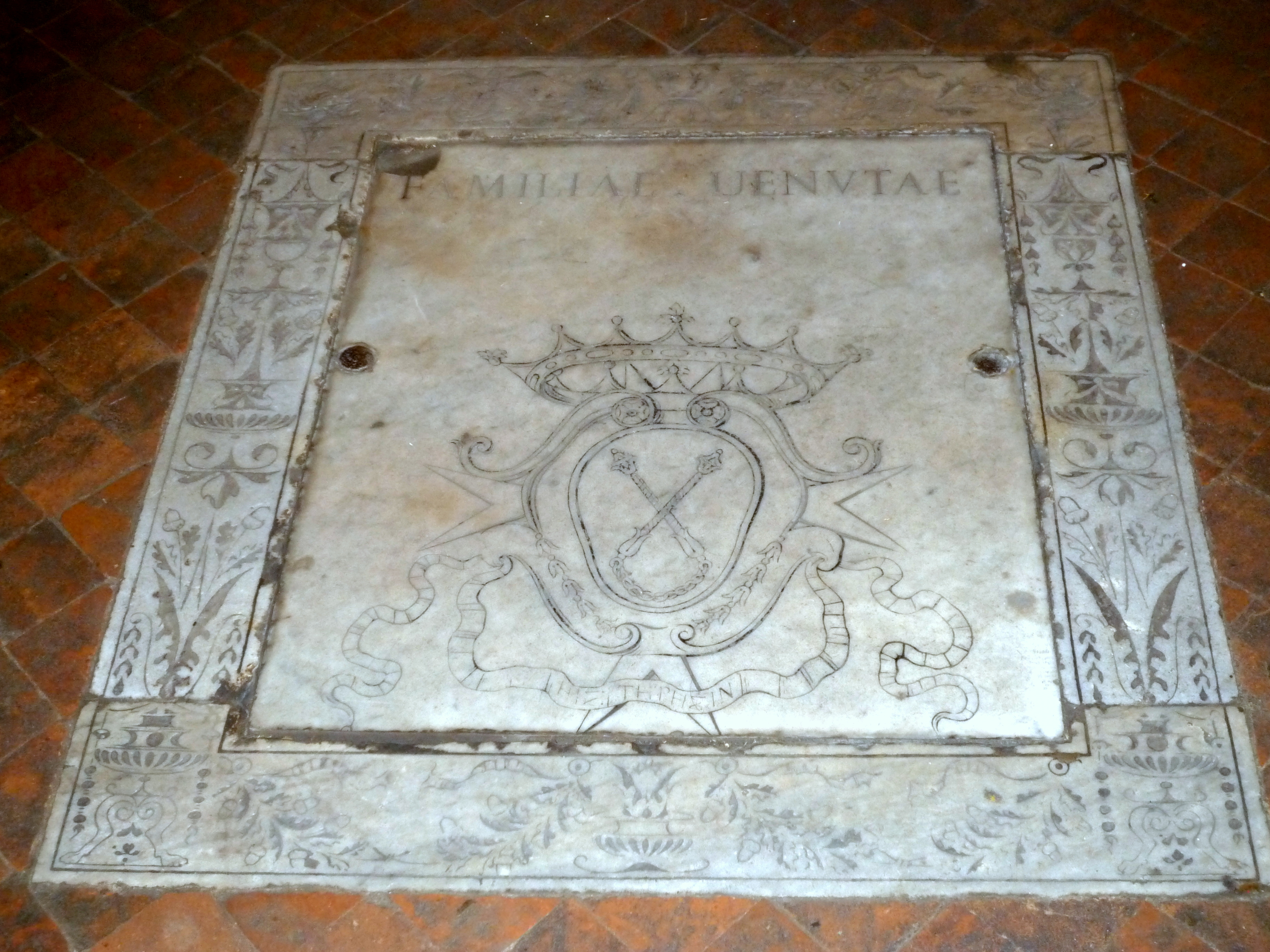
Tombstone of the Venuta family in the floor

== Bibliography ==
- Cristina Acidini, Pintoricchio, in Pittori del Rinascimento, Scala, Firenze 2004. ISBN 88-8117-099-X
- Claudia La Malfa, The Chapel of San Girolamo in Santa Maria del Popolo in Rome, Journal of the Warburg and Courtauld Institutes, 2000, LXIII, pp. 259–270
- Gerald S. Davies: Renascence. The Sculptured Tombs of the Fifteenth Century in Rome, E. P. Dutton and Company, New York, 1916
