= Andrea Bregno =

Italian sculptor and architect (1418–1506)

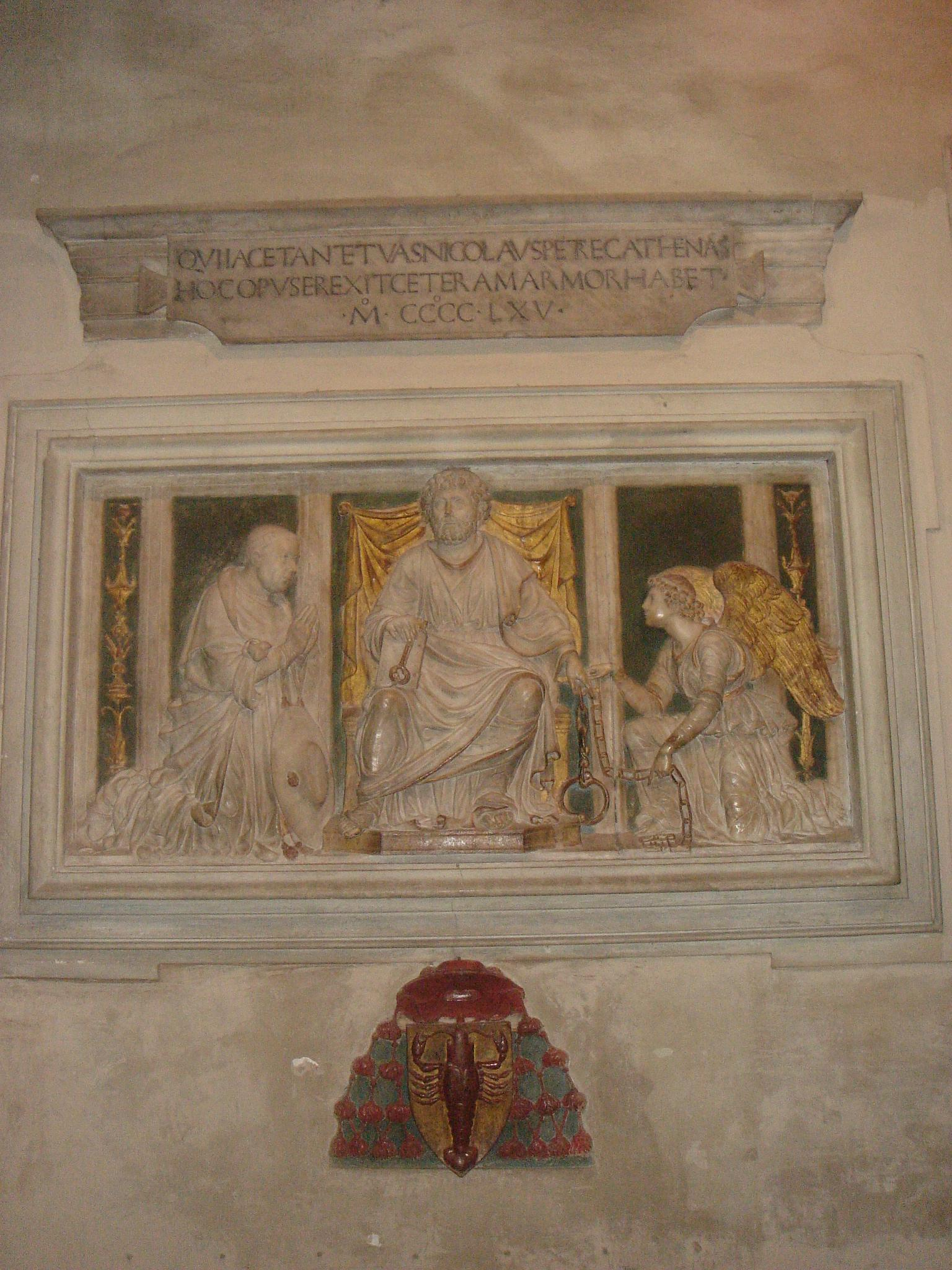
Wall tomb of Nicolas of Cusa, by Andrea Bregno

Andrea di Cristoforo Bregno (1418–1506) was an Italian Renaissance sculptor and architect of the Early Renaissance who worked in Rome from the 1460s and died just as the High Renaissance was getting under way.

== Early life ==
He was born in Osteno, Lombardy, into one of the most famous artistic families in Northern Italy. His father, Cristoforo Bregno, and his brothers, Ambrogio and Girolamo, were also sculptors. They formed a workshop in Ferrara, and took over the supervision of the architecture at the Doge's Palace in Venice after the death of Bartolomeo Bon.

== Career in Rome ==
Andrea Bregno was invited to move from Venice to Rome when the Venetian Paul II was elected Pope. During the pontificate of the Della Rovere Pope Sixtus IV he received many commissions and headed a large workshop, producing many wall tombs of cardinals and other figures of the papal curia with varying degrees of personal responsibility. He was famous among his contemporaries, and was compared to the Greek sculptor Polykleitos in the epitaph of his tomb in Santa Maria sopra Minerva. Raphael's father, Giovanni Santi, mentioned Bregno in the 1480s, in his biography of Federico da Montefeltro, Duke of Urbino. Bregno often worked with Mino da Fiesole in Rome, and his refined Lombard manner was rendered more classical by the contact and by the example of Roman sculptures that were increasingly coming to light, of which Andrea Bregno was an early collector: a certain "Prospettivo Milanese", writing in 1499-1500 refers to a torso in the collection of a "Maestro Andrea" that seems to have been the Belvedere Torso.

He moved in humanist circles and was an esteemed friend of the humanist in Sixtus' circle, Bartolomeo Platina, the librarian of the Vatican Library. Bregno played a significant role in the standardization of an authentically classicizing style of epigraphy, in the inscriptions that accompany his tombs. In the Sistine Chapel he collaborated with Mino da Fiesole and Giovanni Dalmata to produce the little cantoria or choristers' gallery set into the wall, with its own coffered ceiling and carved marble balusters, and the marble screen.

The attribution to Andrea Bregno and Baccio Pontelli of the Church of Santa Maria del Popolo, commissioned by Sixtus IV, is traditional, as is the tradition that the two were responsible for the Palazzo della Cancelleria. Donato Bramante followed in both locations. In Santa Maria del Popolo, Bramante extended the apse, but the facade is of the earlier campaign, picked out in architectural guides as one of the finest pieces of Early Renaissance architecture in Rome. Most of the hexagonal side chapels with sexpartite ribbed vaults and balustrades preserved their original layout.

His late masterwork is the elaborate white marble reredos of the Piccolomini altar in the Duomo of Siena, completed in 1503. It takes the form of an architectural facade round a large central exedra with a half-domed head, and figures in niches. In 1481, Andrea Bregno had started the altar for the tomb of Cardinal Francesco Todeschini-Piccolomini, who was to succeed Pope Alexander VI briefly as Pius III in 1503.

Bregno died in Rome in 1506. His tomb, dated 1506, in Santa Maria sopra Minerva, bears his portrait bust, probably a work of Luigi Capponi.

A symposium held at Urbino, 24–25 June 2006, resulted in the publication Andrea Bregno Giovanni Santi e la cultura adriatica del Rinascimento : Atti del Convegno di Studi, Giuliana Gardelli, ed., (Rome, 2007).

== Tombs (almost all in Rome) ==
- Niche tomb of Cardinal Louis d'Albret (died 1465), Santa Maria in Aracoeli, Rome. Traces of gilding and color remain on the marble.
- Tomb of the polymath Cardinal Nicholas of Cusa (died 1464), San Pietro in Vincoli; with a polychrome relief of Saint Peter flanked by the kneeling cardinal and the Angel of Resurrection. (illustration, upper right)
- Tomb of Cardinal Tebaldi (died 1466), Santa Maria sopra Minerva, executed with Giovanni Dalmata.
- Tomb of Cardinal Alain de Coëtivy (died 1474), in Santa Prassede
- Tomb of Cardinal Pietro Riario (died 1474, in the Church of Santi XII Apostoli.
- Tomb of Cardinal Cristoforo della Rovere (died 1477), a nephew of Sixtus IV, in the Della Rovere Chapel, Santa Maria del Popolo. A Madonna is by Mino da Fiesole.
- Tomb of Raffael Della Rovere (died 1477), the brother of Sixtus IV, crypt of Santi XII Apostoli (unfinished)
- Tomb of Cardinal Juan Díaz de Coca (died 1477), Santa Maria sopra Minerva, Rome.
- Wall tomb of Fra Lippo Lippi, Spoleto cathedral, c. 1492.
- Tomb of Cardinal Jorge da Costa, in the Costa Chapel, Santa Maria del Popolo, 1502
- Tomb of Cardinal Antoniotto Pallavicini, in the Montemirabile Chapel, Santa Maria del Popolo (workshop)

== Other works ==
- Madonna, marble bas-relief in the Ospedale di San Giacomo in Augusta, Rome.
- Altar (1469) in the Salviati Chapel, San Gregorio Magno al Celio. With a relief of The Apparition of St Michael to St Gregory.
- Tabernacle, Sanctuary of Santa Maria della Quercia, Viterbo
- Two ciboria, in the Montemirabile Chapel, Santa Maria del Popolo.
