= Costa Chapel =

Chapel in the church of Santa Maria del Popolo, Rome

- Capella Costa
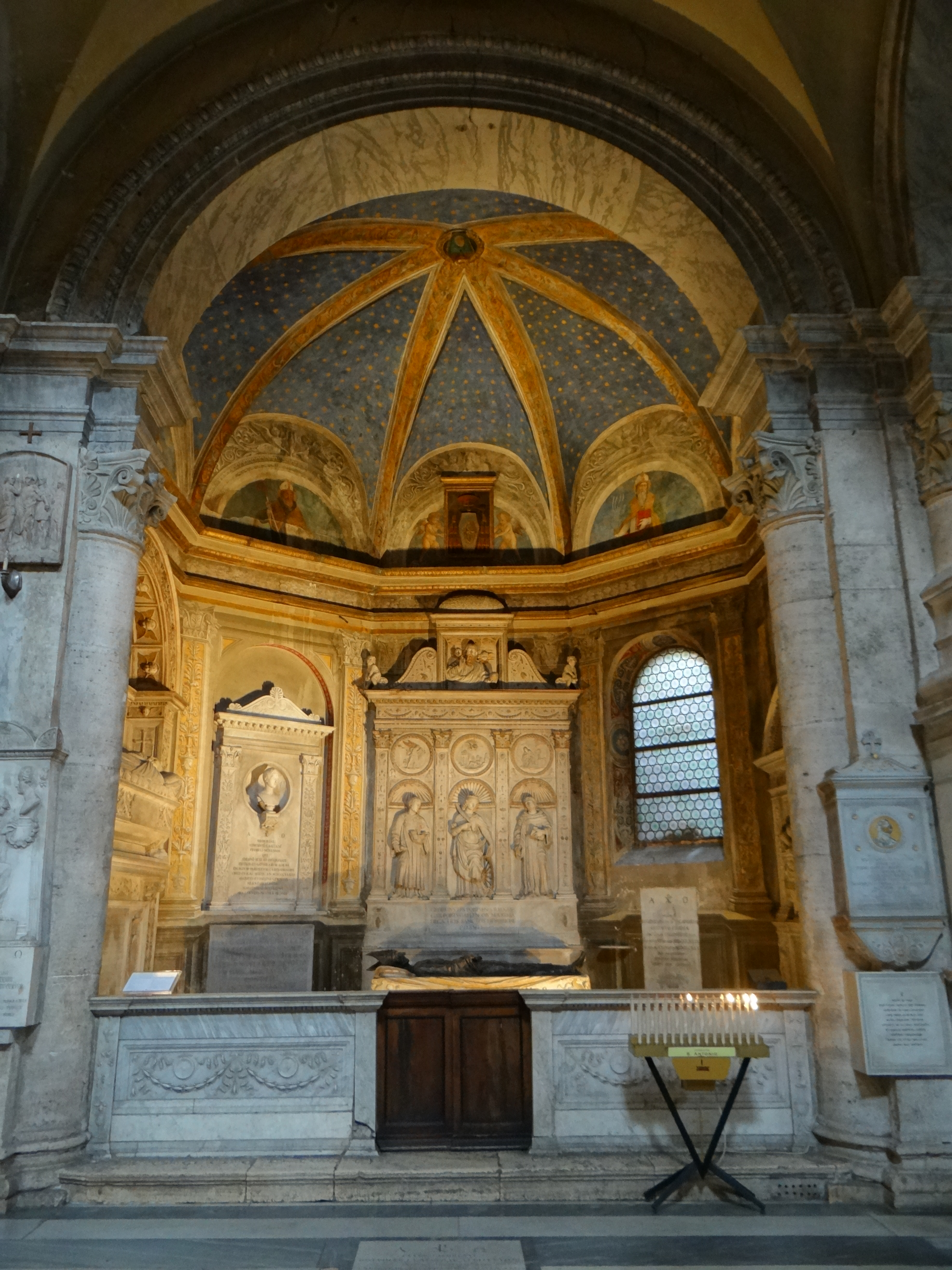
- Interior of the Costa Chapel
- Location: Santa Maria del Popolo, Rome
- Country: Italy

History
- Status: Chapel
- Founder: Jorge da Costa
- Dedication: Saint Catherine of Alexandria

Architecture
- Functional status: Active
- Architectural type: Chapel
- Style: Renaissance
- Completed: c. 1488

Specifications
- Materials: Marble, fresco

Administration
- Diocese: Rome
- Parish: Santa Maria del Popolo

The Costa or St Catherine Chapel (Italian: Cappella Costa or Cappella di Santa Caterina) is located in the south aisle of the Basilica of Santa Maria del Popolo in Rome. This is the fourth side chapel from the counterfaçade and was dedicated to St Catherine of Alexandria. The lunettes were painted by the helpers of Pinturicchio and the marble altar-piece is attributed to Gian Cristoforo Romano.

== History ==
The chapel was originally owned by Domenico della Rovere but it was acquired by Portuguese Cardinal Jorge da Costa (the italianized name is Giorgio Costa) for 200 gold ducats in 1488. Costa was a well-known and influential person in the court of Pope Alexander VI. The Cardinal employed the same workshop of painters as the Della Rovere dynasty, the school of Pinturicchio. It is not unlikely that the patron consciously sought out the same artist. The chapel preserved its original form except one window that was walled up for the creation of a new funeral monument in 1833.

== Description ==
The small chapel is hexagonal with a sexpartite ribbed vault and the entrance is protected by an elegant marble parapet which is decorated by garlands, ribbons and patenas. The fresco decoration was painted by a helper of Pinturicchio, stylistically close to Melozzo da Forli. The side walls are articulated by painted Corinthian pilasters decorated with candelabra, flowers and garlands on a yellow background, resting on a fake monochrome pedestal. The ribs and the splays of the two arched windows were decorated with grotesques but only the right-hand window is preserved (the other was later walled up). The vault is covered with a blue carpet and gold stars. The overall concept of the painted decoration is similar to that of the Della Rovere Chapel but the sculptural elements play a bigger part in the Costa Chapel.

=== Lunettes ===
The most important original frescos in the chapel are the paintings of the five lunettes (1488-90). Four of them depict the Fathers of the Church in front of a blue background: St. Jerome, Ambrose, Augustine and Gregory the Great. The central lunette is filled with the sculpted coats-of-arms of Cardinal Costa (the wheel of St Catherine) which is supported by two painted angels.

=== Sculptural works ===
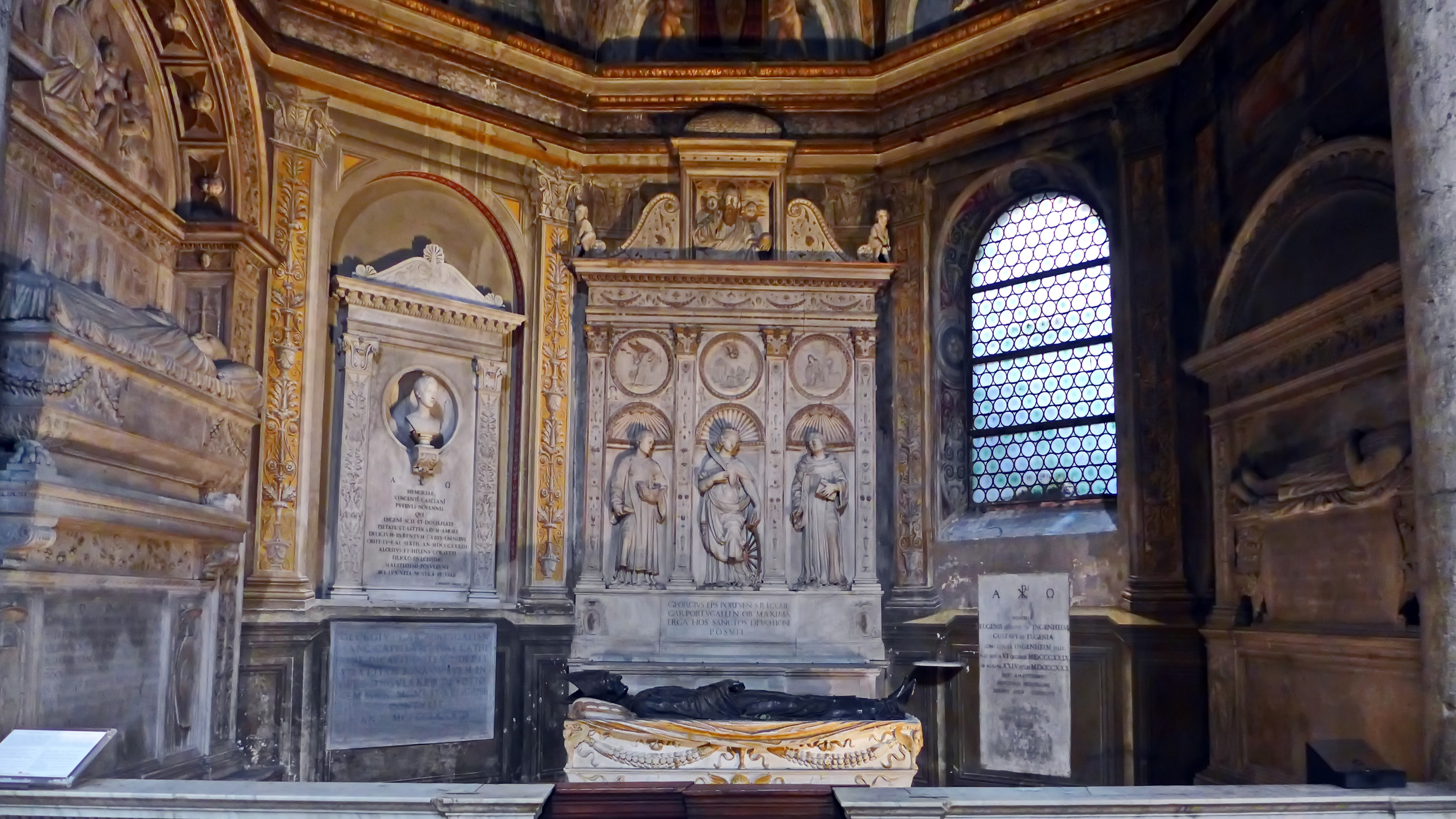
General view with tombs and monuments

The main altar-piece is attributed to Gian Cristoforo Romano (c. 1505). It was certainly built after 1503 because the inscription at the base calls the Cardinal the Bishop of Porto and Santa Rufina. The tripartite marble reredos is articulated by Corinthian pilasters and crowned by an elaborate pediment with the figure of God, the Father. There are three sculptures of saints in shell-headed niches: St. Catherine of Alexandria in the middle (with the wheel), St. Vincent (with the ship) and Anthony of Padua (with a lily). The latter two are the patrons of the city of Lisbon. Three tondos above them contain reliefs of the Annunciation (with a very fine landscape in the middle). The high pedestal is decorated with the coats-of-arms of Cardinal Costa.

The funeral monument of a young Roman knight, Marcantonio Albertoni, who died in a plague at the age of 30 in 1485, covers the right wall. The marble sepulchre with the recumbent effigy of the deceased was created by Iacopo di Andrea da Firenze in 1487. Originally, at least until 1600, it was placed in the right transept. The marble tomb was commissioned by the knight's mother, Caterina Albertoni. It is the only known work of the Florentine sculptor who was mentioned in the contract dated to 20 April 1487.

On the opposite side is the monument of Cardinal Jorge da Costa created by the school of Bregno. The lunette is filled by a lovely relief of Mary in mandorla with two angels. Costa died in 1508 but the tomb was probably prepared well before this date, probably few years after the dedication of the chapel. The inscription on the sarcophagus declares that "Giorgio, bishop of Albano, cardinal from Lisbon, while he turned over in his mind that he was mortal, erected [this tomb monument] for himself while still alive". It is very similar to the monument of Cristoforo della Rovere in the Chapel of the Nativity but "in a less masterly workmanship".

The third original monument is the tombstone (in the floor) of Archbishop Giorgio Bracharin by the workshop of Antonio del Pollaiuolo (end of 15th century). The tombstone is undated. The Archbishop lies in full robes, his hands crossed. The relief is very deep and a rich spiral border runs around the slab.

In 1833 another monument was placed in the chapel: the funeral monument of the nine-year old Vincenzo Casciani by Luigi Poletti and Matteo Kassel. The left-hand window was walled up to provide space for the new neoclassical marble monument.

A white marble slab was set under the other window in 1830 for Eugen von Ingenheim, the one-year old infant son of Count Gustav Adolf Wilhelm von Ingenheim, the morganatic son of King Frederick William II of Prussia, who converted to Catholicism. The Ingenheims were owners of the chapel in the 19th century.

Effigy of Pietro Foscari

The marble and bronze sepulchral monument of Cardinal Pietro Foscari was originally placed in the middle of the Foscari Chapel, which was demolished for the building of the Cerasi Chapel in 1600. It was made by a Sienese sculptor, Giovanni di Stefano in the 1480s but previously thought to have been created by Vecchietta.

The prelate wears a richly folded robe, gloves, boots and a particularly sumptuous mitre which all serve to emphasize his dignity. All the details are modelled with great precision and virtuosity. The austere dark colour of the bronze is further enhanced by the contrasting white marble support. This bier is decorated with gilded reliefs of festoons, winged angels and trophies and it is covered by a folded drapery. The head rests on an embroidered cushion sculpted of glossy white marble.

== Gallery ==
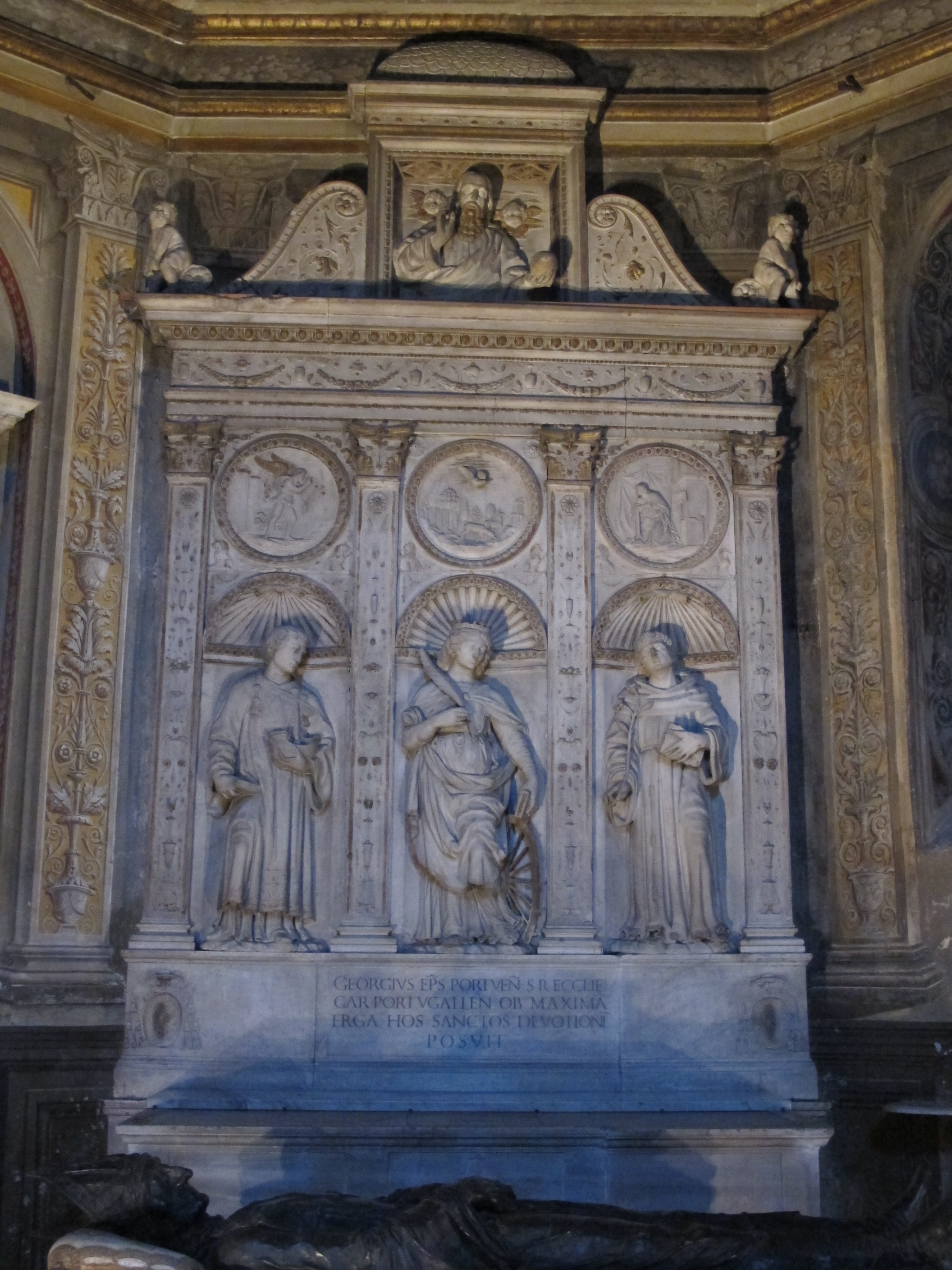
The marble altar-piece by Gian Cristoforo Romano

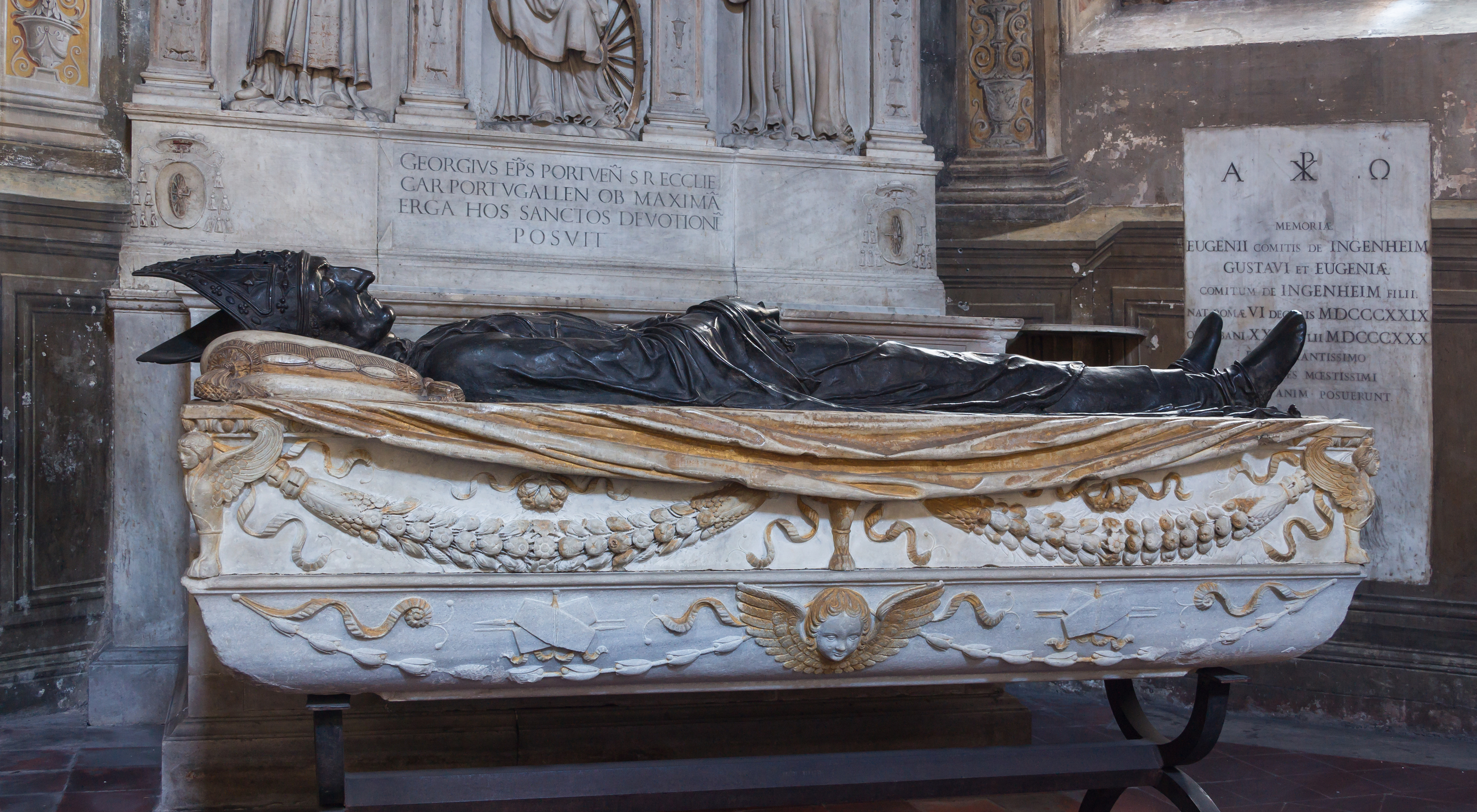
Tomb of Cardinal Pietro Foscari by Giovanni di Stefano

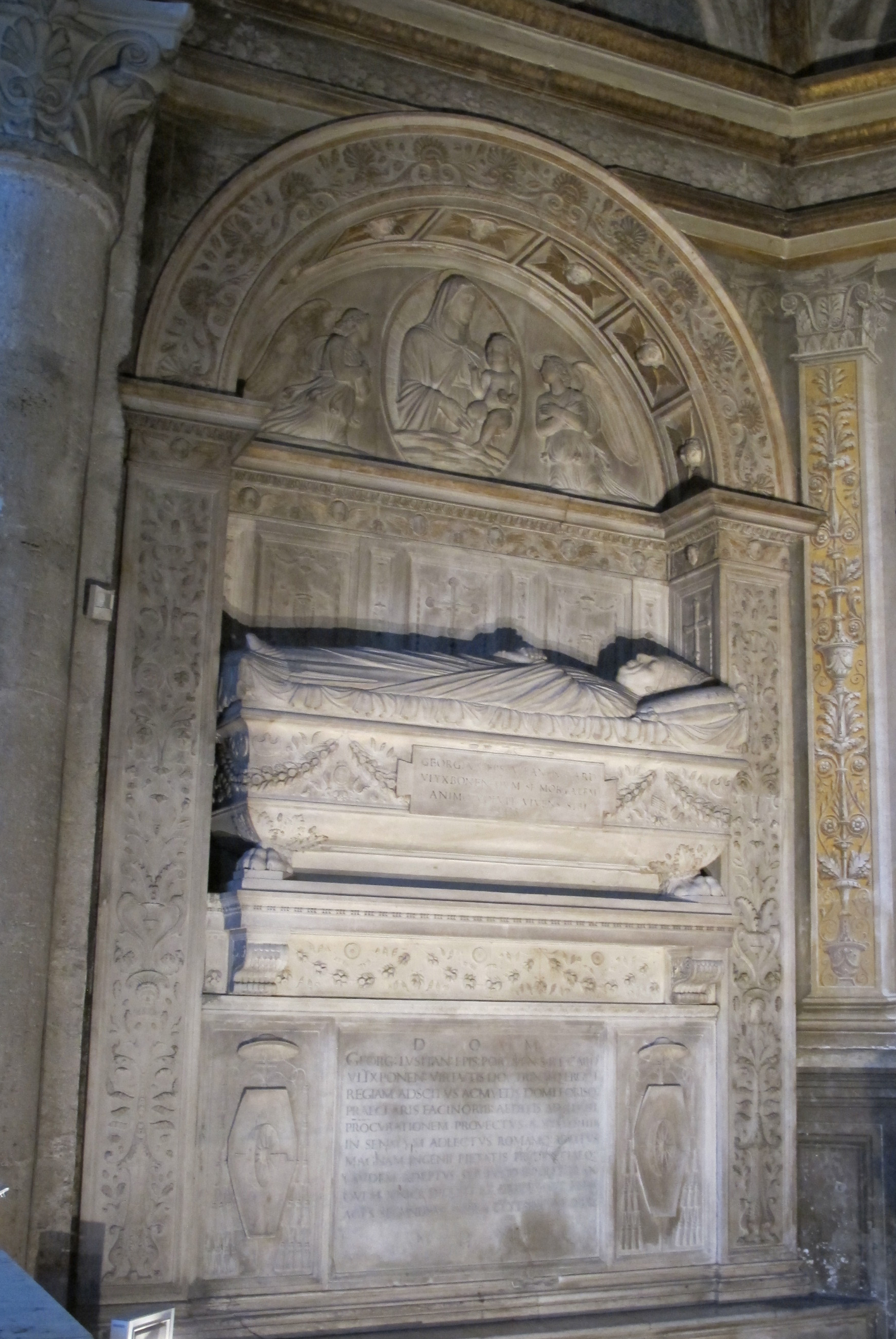
Monument of Jorge da Costa by the school of Bregno

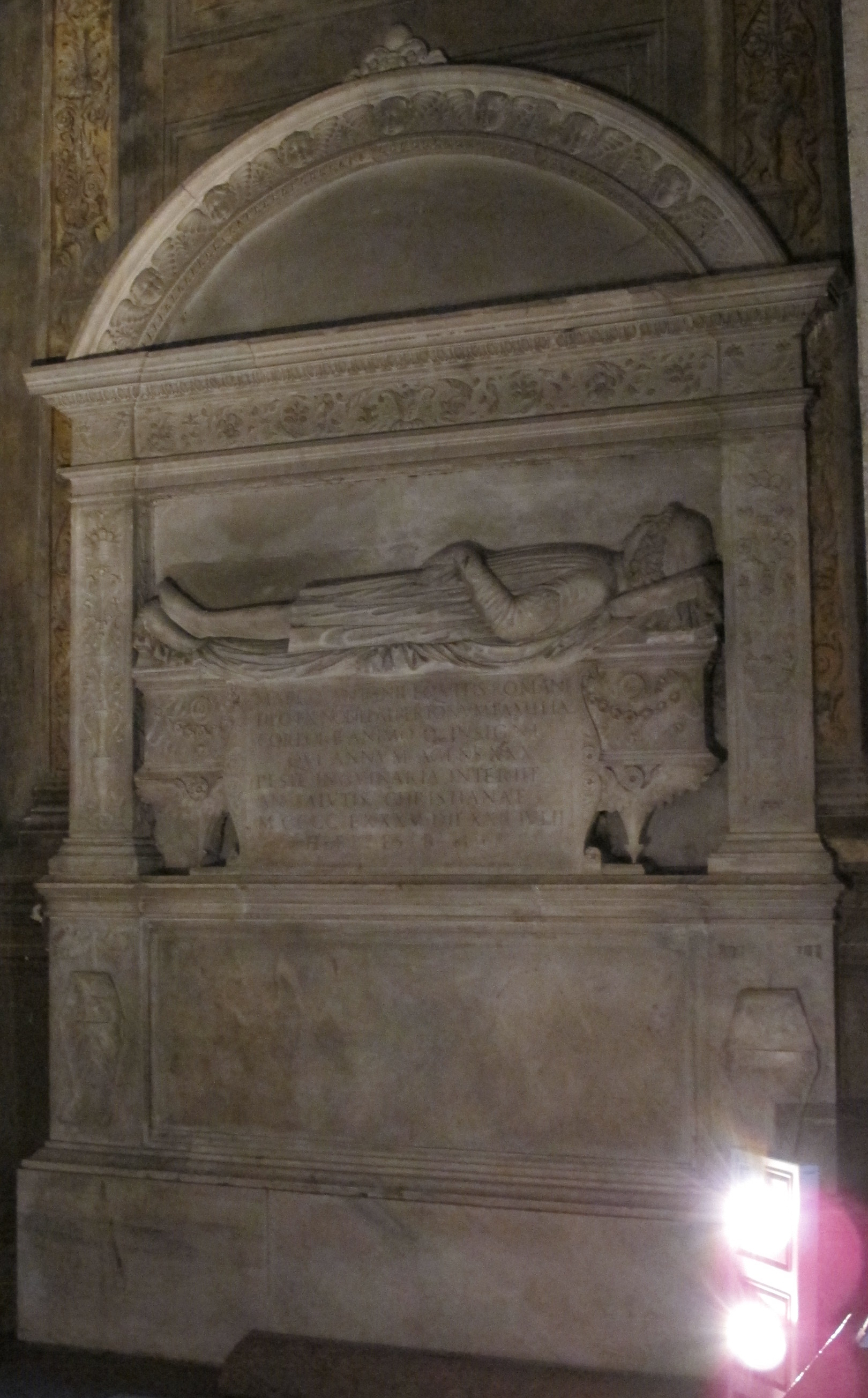
Monument of Marcantonio Albertoni by Jacopo d'Andrea da Firenze

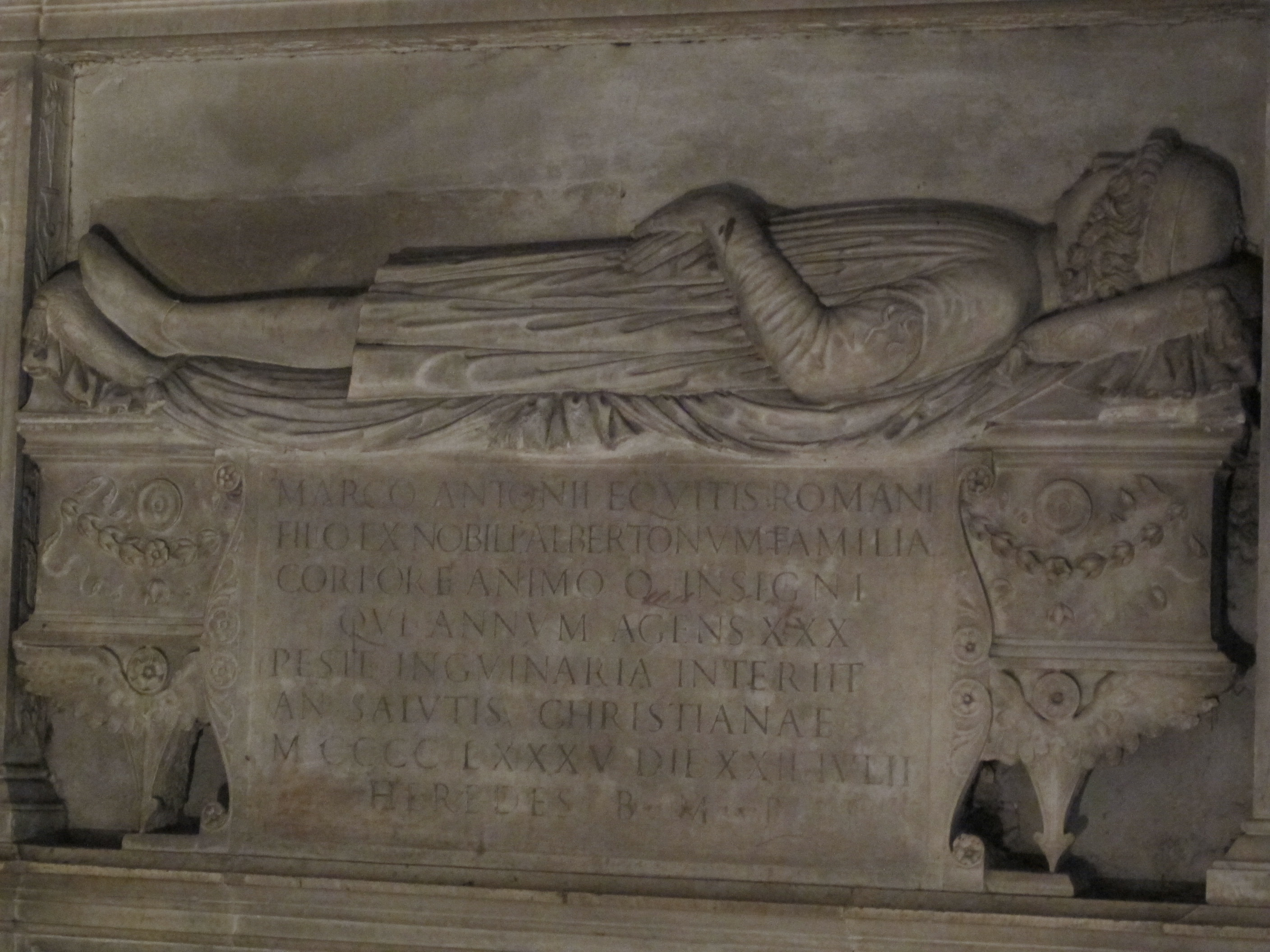
Effigy of Marcantonio Albertoni

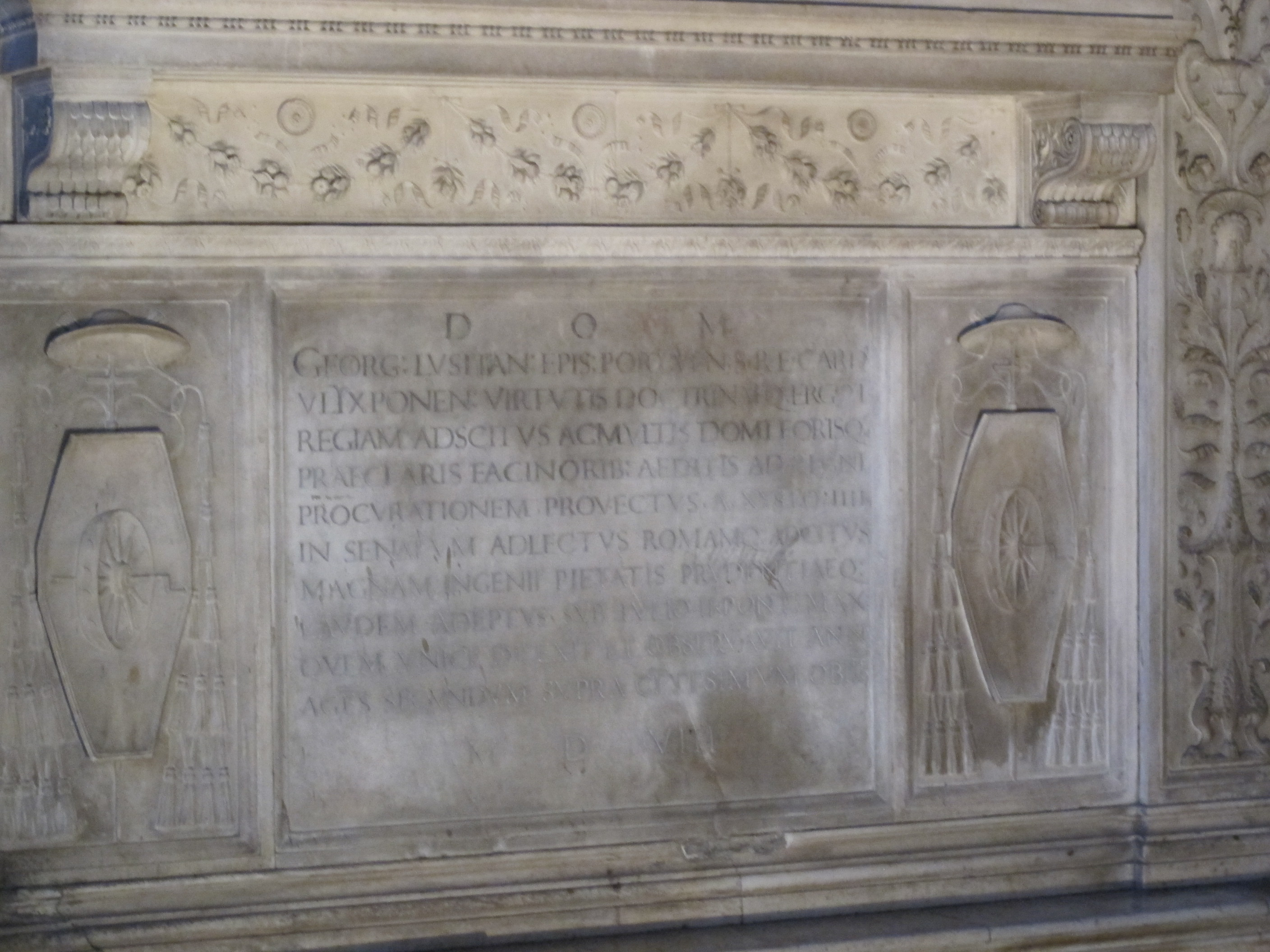
Inscription on the tomb of Cardinal Costa with his coats-of-arms

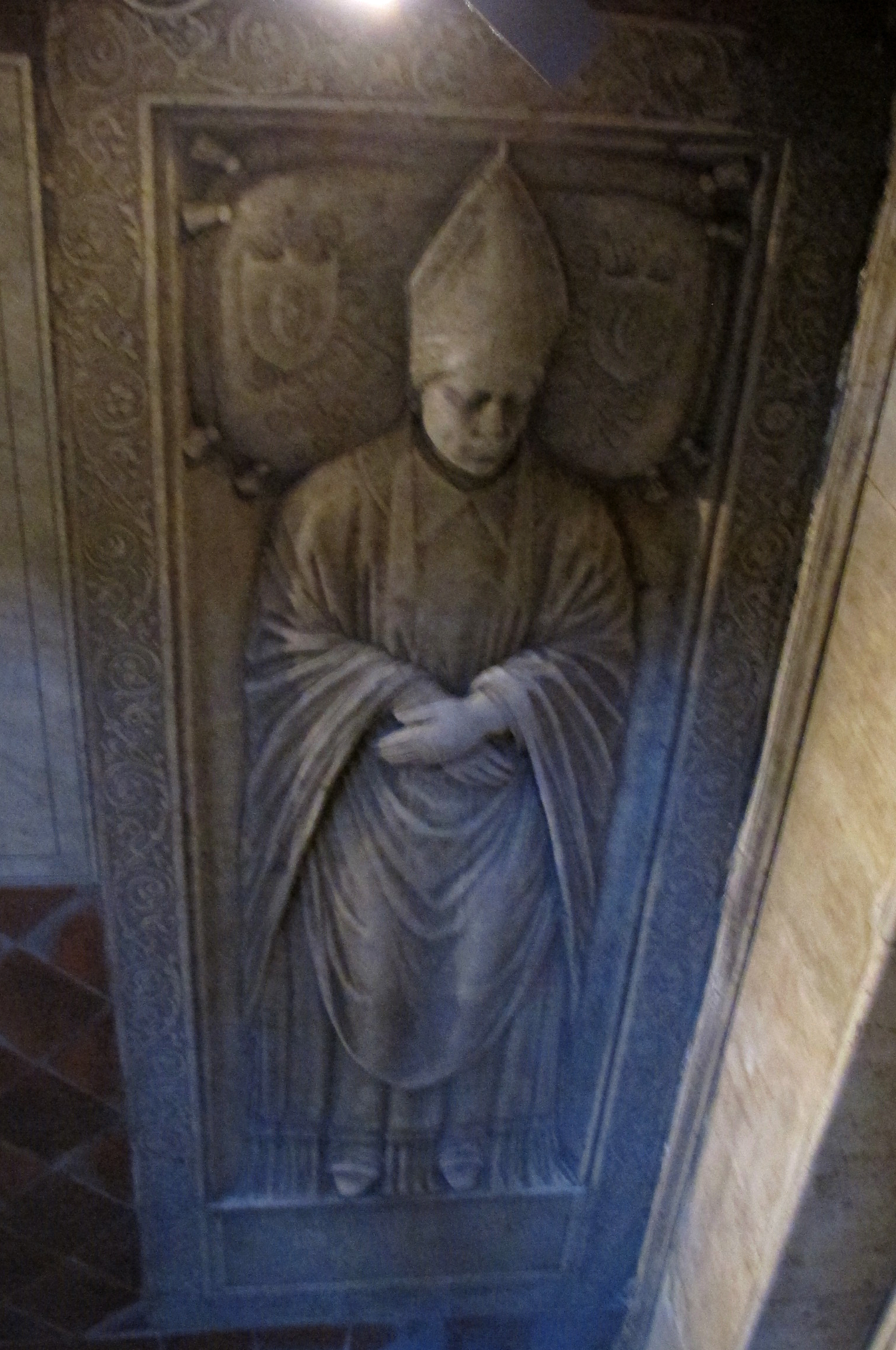
Tombstone of Giorgio Bracharin by the workshop of Pollaiolo

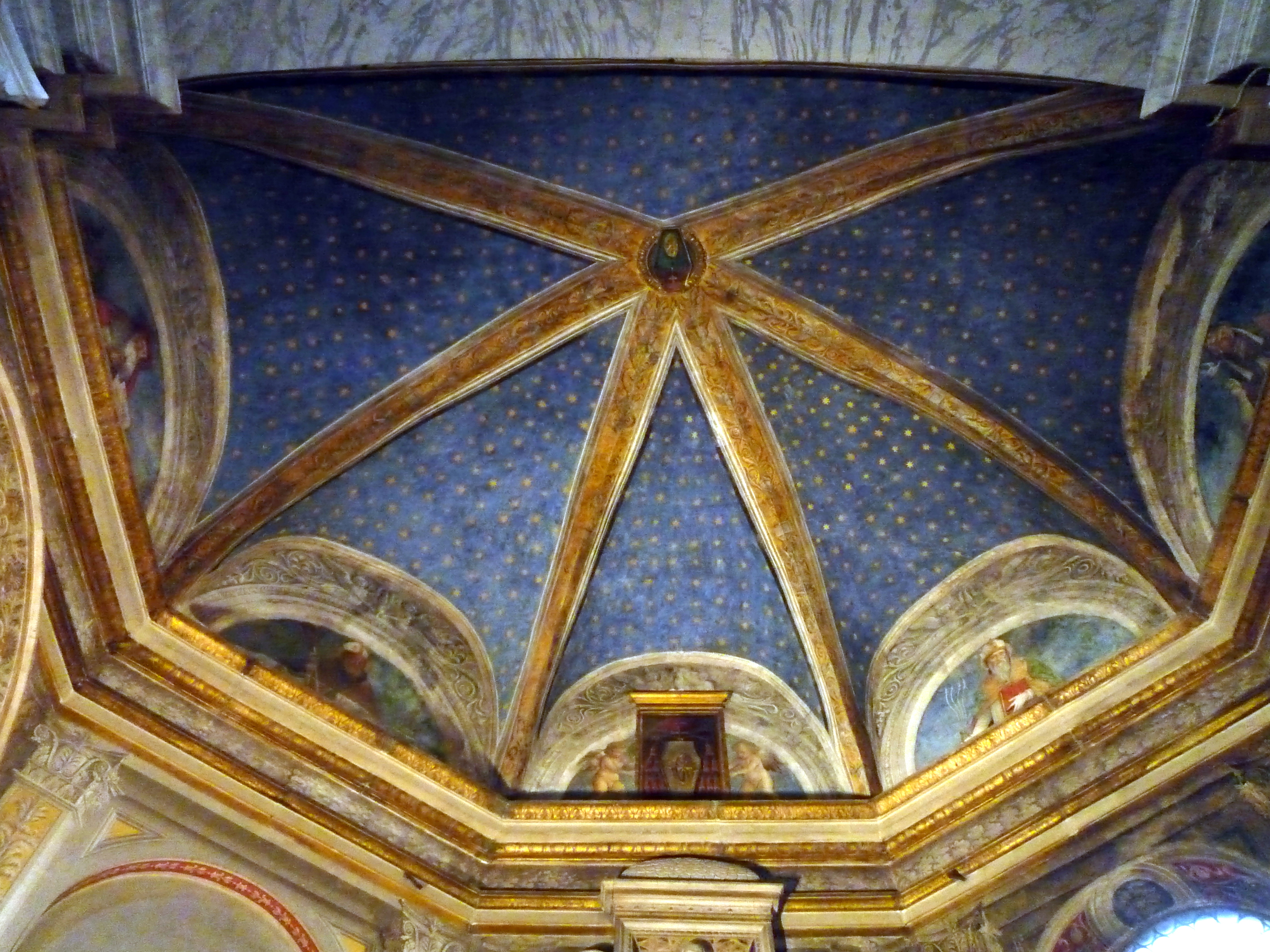
The sixpartite ribbed vault with the lunettes

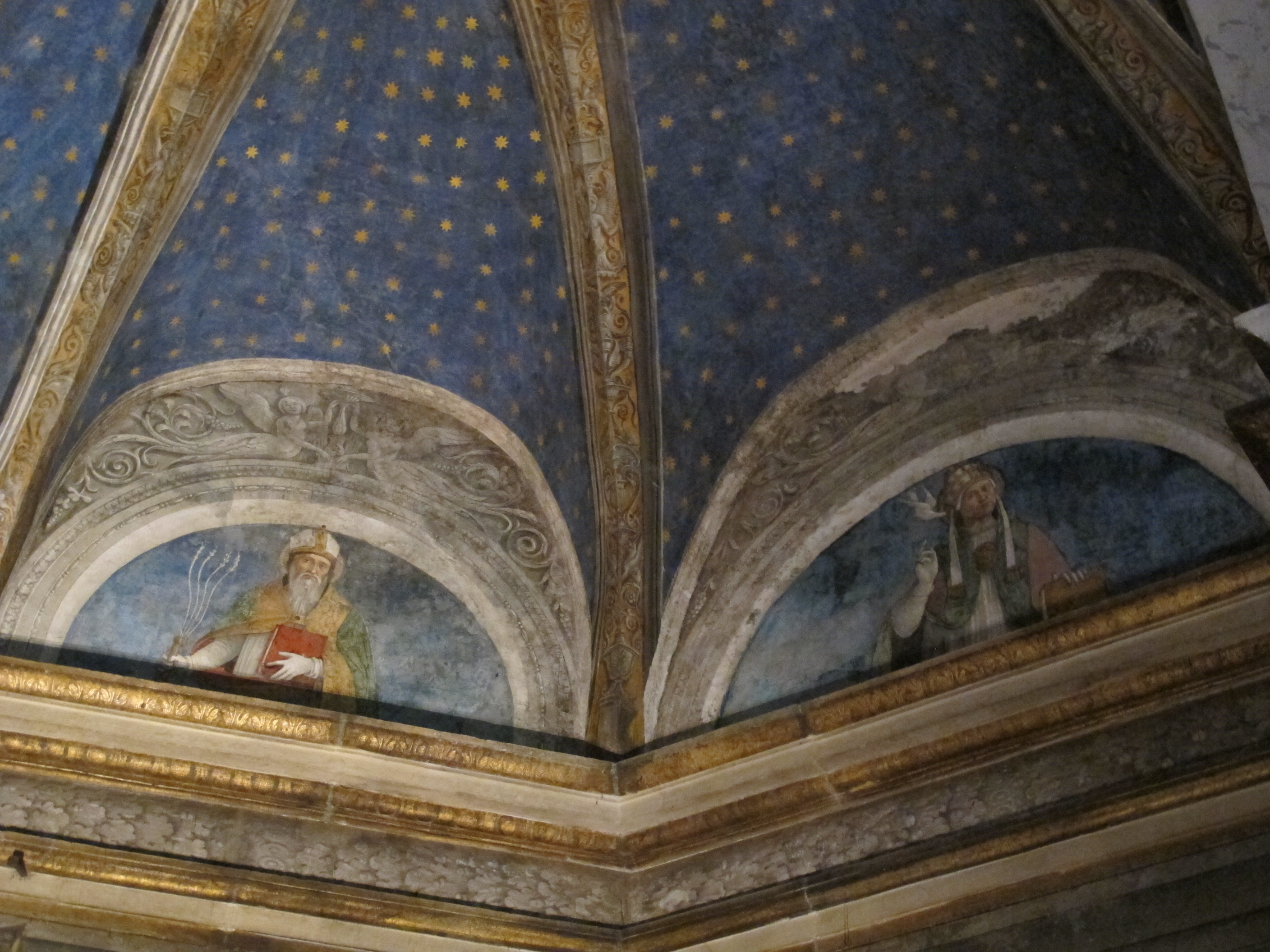
Sts Ambrose and Gregory the Great by Pinturicchio (lunettes)

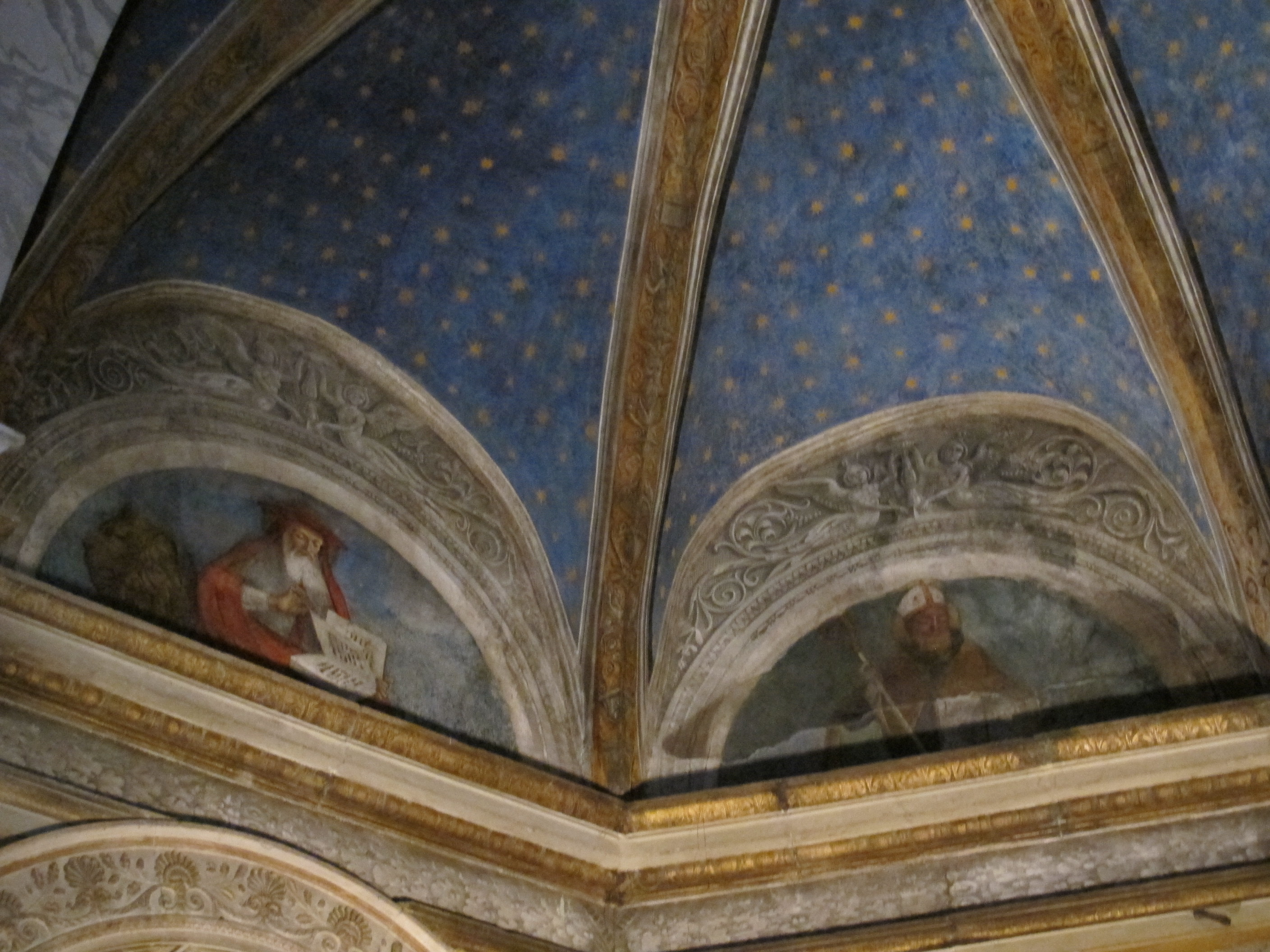
Sts Jerome and Augustine by Pinturicchio (lunettes)

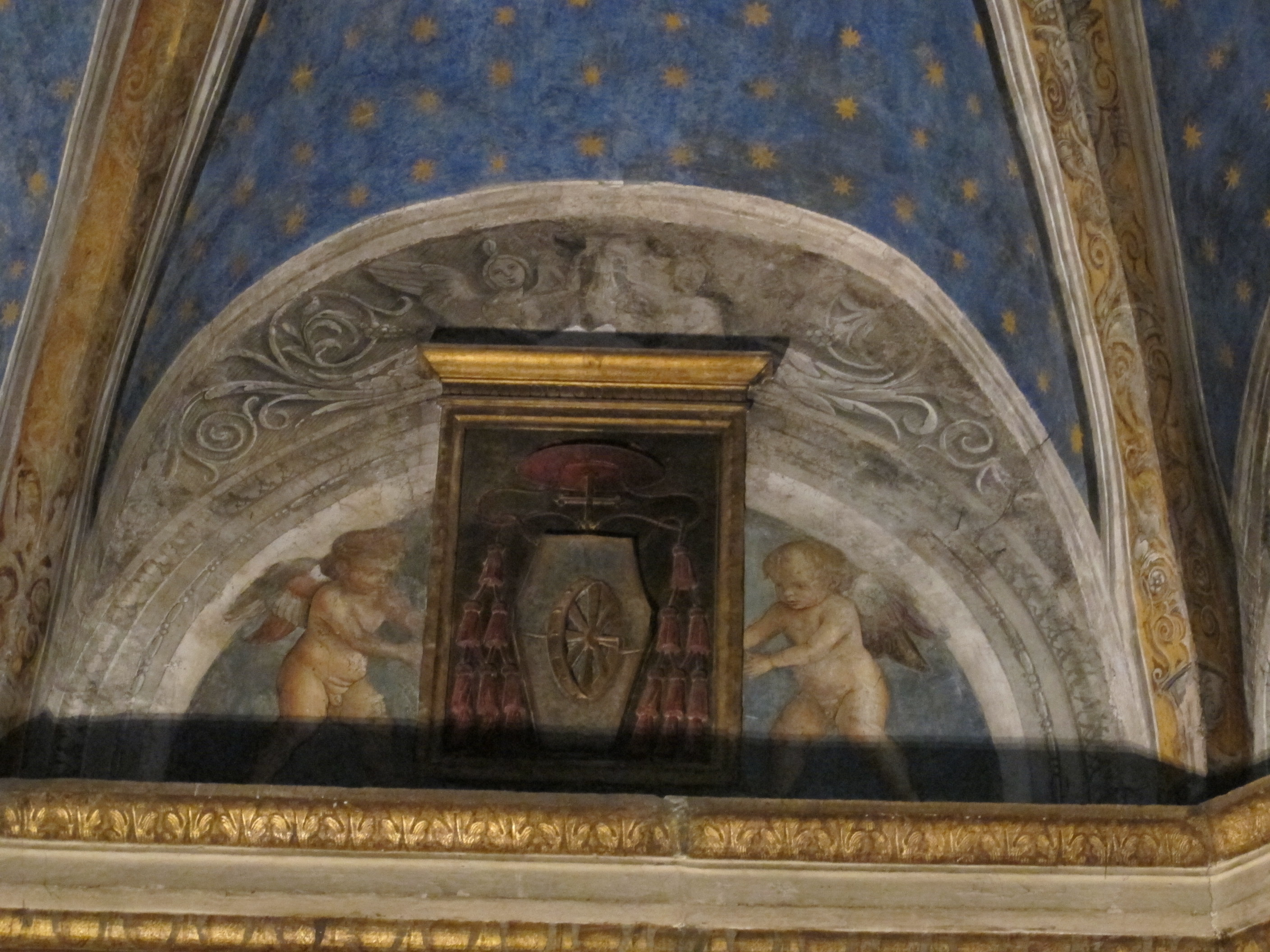
The coat-of-arms of Cardinal Jorge da Costa with the wheel (central lunette)

== Bibliography ==
- Lisa Passaglia Bauman, Piety and Public Consumption: Domenico, Girolamo and Julius II della Rovere at Santa Maria del Popolo; in: Patronage and Dynasty. The Rise of the Della Rovere in Renaissance Italy, Truman State University Press, 2007
- Sara Magister: Iacopo di Andrea, in: Dizionario Biografico degli Italiani - Vol. 62 (2004)
- Gerald S. Davies: Renascence. The Sculptured Tombs of the Fifteenth Century in Rome, E. P. Dutton and Company, New York, 1916
