= Montemirabile Chapel =

Chapel in the church of Santa Maria del Popolo, Rome

Montemirabile Chapel Cappella Montemirabile
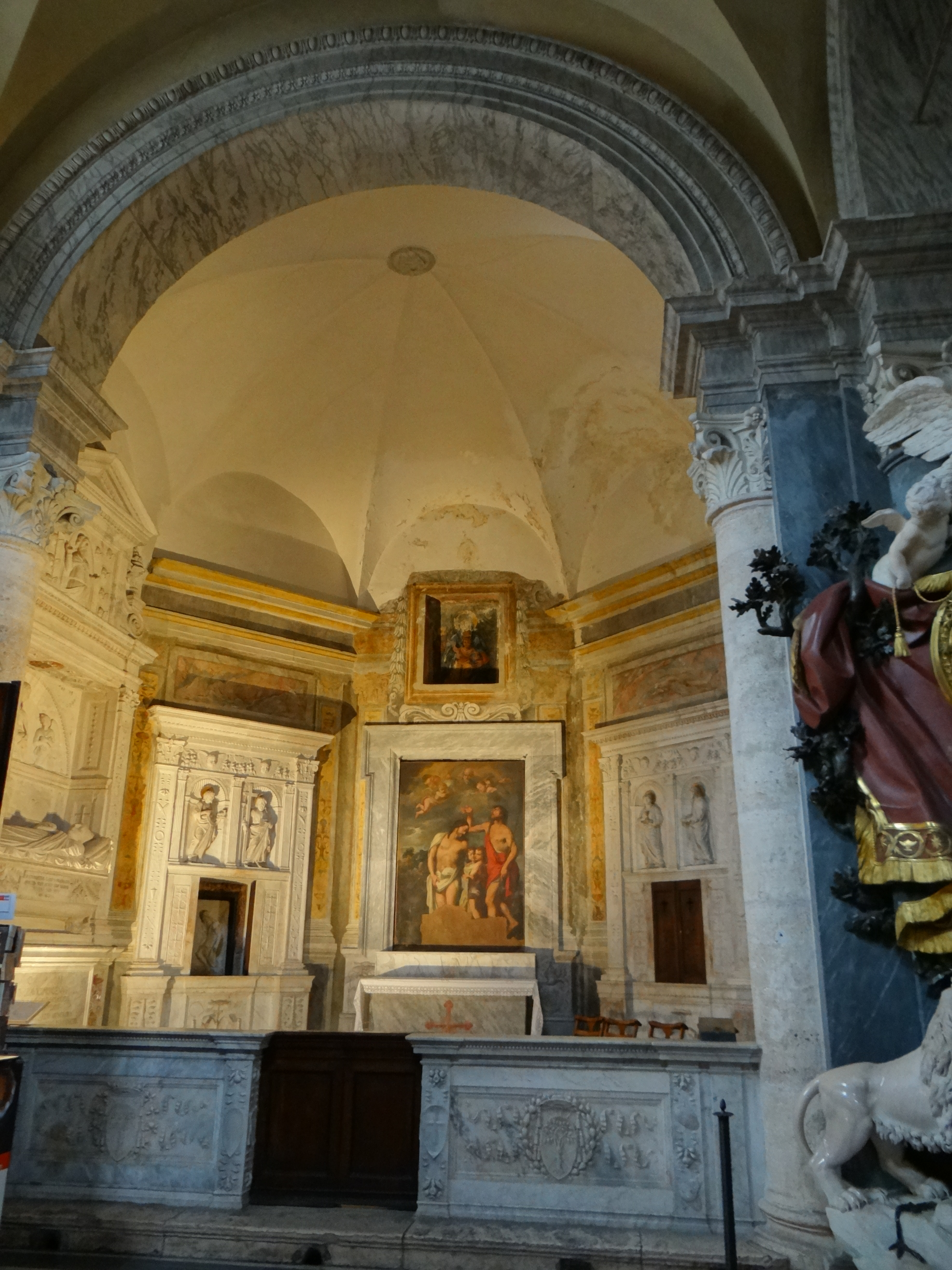

Religion
- Status: baptistery

Location
- Location: Basilica of Santa Maria del Popolo, Rome
- Interactive map of Montemirabile Chapel; Cappella Montemirabile
- Coordinates: 41.911389°N 12.476389°E

Architecture
- Type: hexagonal chapel
- Style: Renaissance
- Founder: Pope Sixtus IV

The Montemirabile or Saint John the Baptist Chapel, otherwise the Baptistery (Italian: Cappella Montemirabile, Cappella di San Giovanni Battista, Cappella del battistero) is the first side chapel in the left aisle in the Basilica of Santa Maria del Popolo.

== History ==
The chapel is named after Giovanni Montemirabile (an italianized name for Jean de Montmirail), the bishop of Vaison and confidant of Pope Sixtus IV, who was buried here after the chapel had been built in the 1470s. This was the first of the original four identical chapels on the left side and it was dedicated to St. John the Baptist. The chapel was transformed into the baptistery of the basilica in 1561. After 1568 a Renaissance funeral monument was built for Cardinal Francesco Abbondio Castiglioni by the right side wall. The monumental Renaissance wall tomb of Cardinal Antoniotto Pallavicini was transferred to the chapel in the second quarter of the 17th century, its bulk partially hiding from view or replacing the original painted decoration of the left wall. In 1657 fragments of a demolished quattrocento monument from the choir were reassembled in the chapel in the form of two aediculae by Cardinal Flavio Chigi, the nephew of Pope Alexander VII, who was Cardinal-Priest of the basilica at the time.

Sometime before 1674 a new painting was made for the main altar by Pasquale Rossi. The previous altarpiece depicted the same subject bearing an inscription: Ex piorum amicorum elemosynis, meaning "from the gifts of the pious friends". This shows that the chapel was not under the patronage of any particular family.

== Description ==
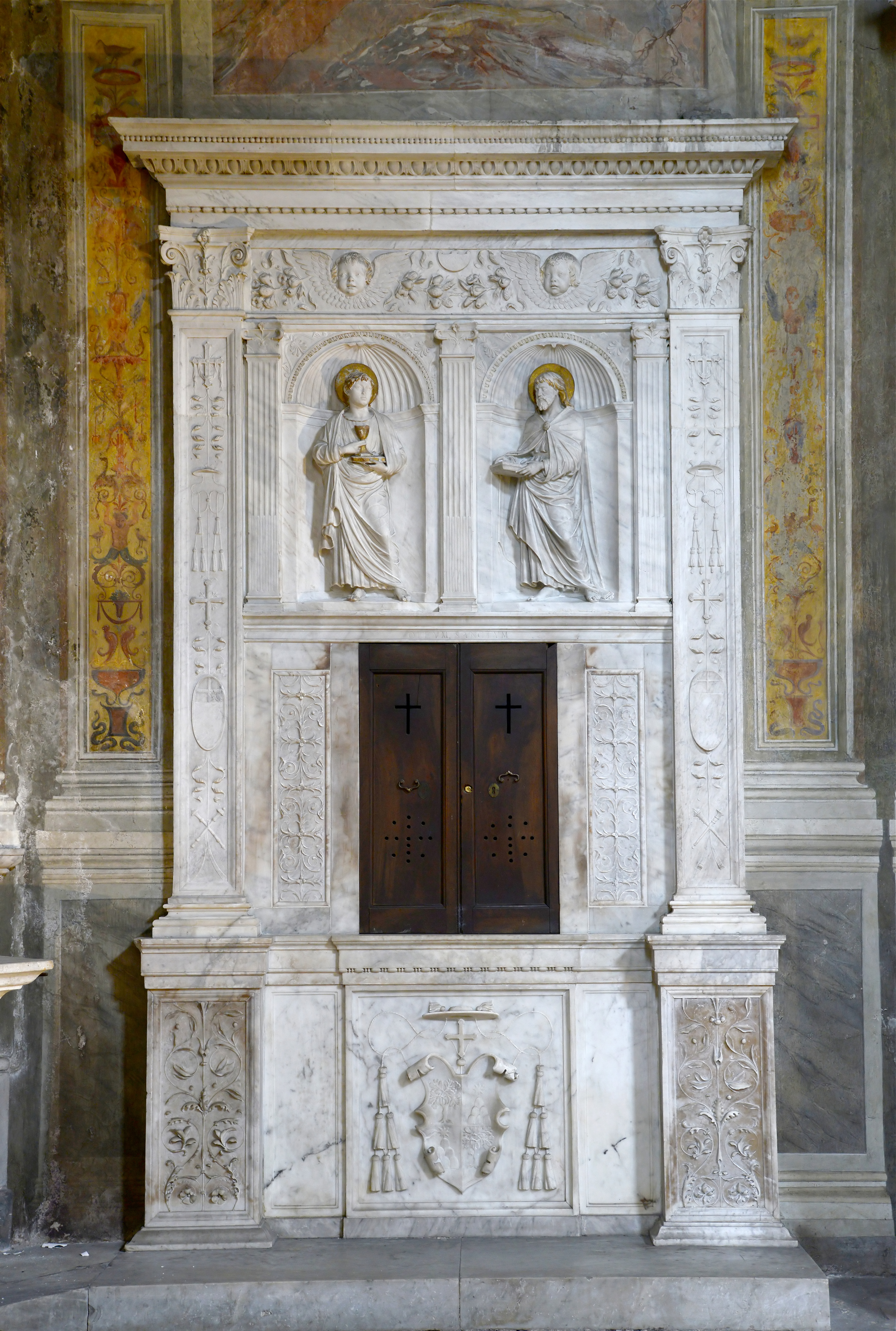
The aumbry for the holy oil

Although the chapel retained its basic architectural layout, many of its features were lost during the later alterations. The side walls of the windowless, hexagonal chapel are articulated by painted Corinthian pilasters decorated with tendrils, vases, flowers, animals, sphinxes, phantastic creatures and garlands on a yellow background, resting on a fake marble pedestal. These were created by the workshop of Pinturicchio. The vault is simply painted white. The keystone bears the escutcheon of Pope Sixtus IV encircled by an egg and dart moulding. The entrance arch of the chapel is painted to look like grey marble; it is decorated with a band of acanthus leaves and an egg and dart edge.

Aediculae

The most valuable works of art in the chapel are the aediculae of the baptismal font and the holy oil (oleum sanctum) on either side of the main altar. They were assembled in 1657 from 15th-century marble fragments and integrated with new additions. The original pieces are exquisite sculptural works by the school of Andrea Bregno. Pico Cellini claimed that the sculptures of the saints in the shell-headed niches had previously decorated the rear side of Bregno's old main altar which was demolished in 1627 (the front side is kept in the sacristy). This theory remains disputed because that statues might have come from other demolished monuments in the basilica like the lost Borgia tombs. The identification of the four saints are uncertain except the figure of John the Baptist (with scroll and lamb) on the baptismal font and John the Evangelist (with chalice) on the font of the holy oil. The symbols, the haloes and the hair of the figures are gilded. The shafts of the Composite pilasters are decorated with ecclesiastical symbols: different types of crosses, cardinal's hats, torches, wreathes, palm branches, lamps. The shields with the crosses on the pilasters of the aedicula of the holy oil indicate that these parts came from the Cybo chapels. On the dropped friezes there are pairs of cherub heads between bunches of fruits. Inside the niche of the baptismal font there is a relief depicting the Baptism of Jesus. The coats of arms on the plinths belong to Cardinal Flavio Chigi.

Parapet

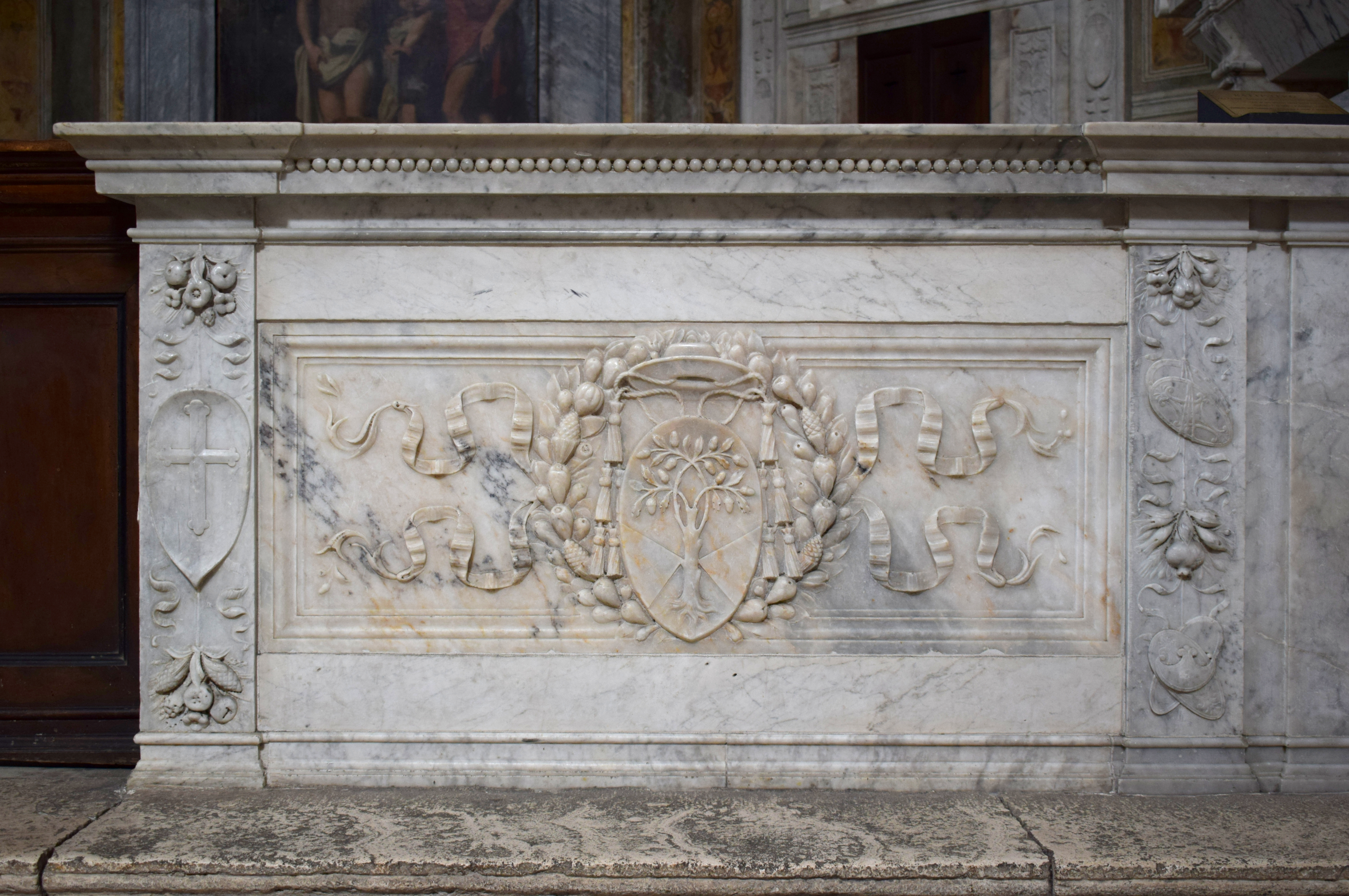
Marble parapet slab

The 15th-century parapet with the coats-of-arms of a Della Rovere cardinal is probably the finest in the basilica. It shows a strong similarity to the parapet of the Della Rovere Chapel. The central motifs are the coats themselves which are surrounded by wreathes of fruit and fluttering ribbons. The white marble central slabs are flanked by dwarf pillars which are decorated with different types of shields and bunches of fruits, ears and flowers. There is a cross botonny on the large shield in the middle of the right door pillar. The matching shield on the other side is empty and the pillar has a rough, unfinished surface. There are many other subtle differences between the two sides: the wreath on the left is less closely set, and it contains acorns, ears of wheat and poppy pods, the ribbons on the left have tufts at their ends while those on the right have pretty flowers sprouting.

Unusually the inner side of the parapet is decorated as well. The central motif on each slab is an antique wine jug and a palm branch placed crosswise. These are hanging from a knot of flowered ribbons and framed by a festoon of olive leaves that are ornamented with fluttering, flowered ribbons. There is a playful variedness in the ornamentation with a lot of slight differences between the two reliefs.

Tomb of Antoniotto Pallavicini

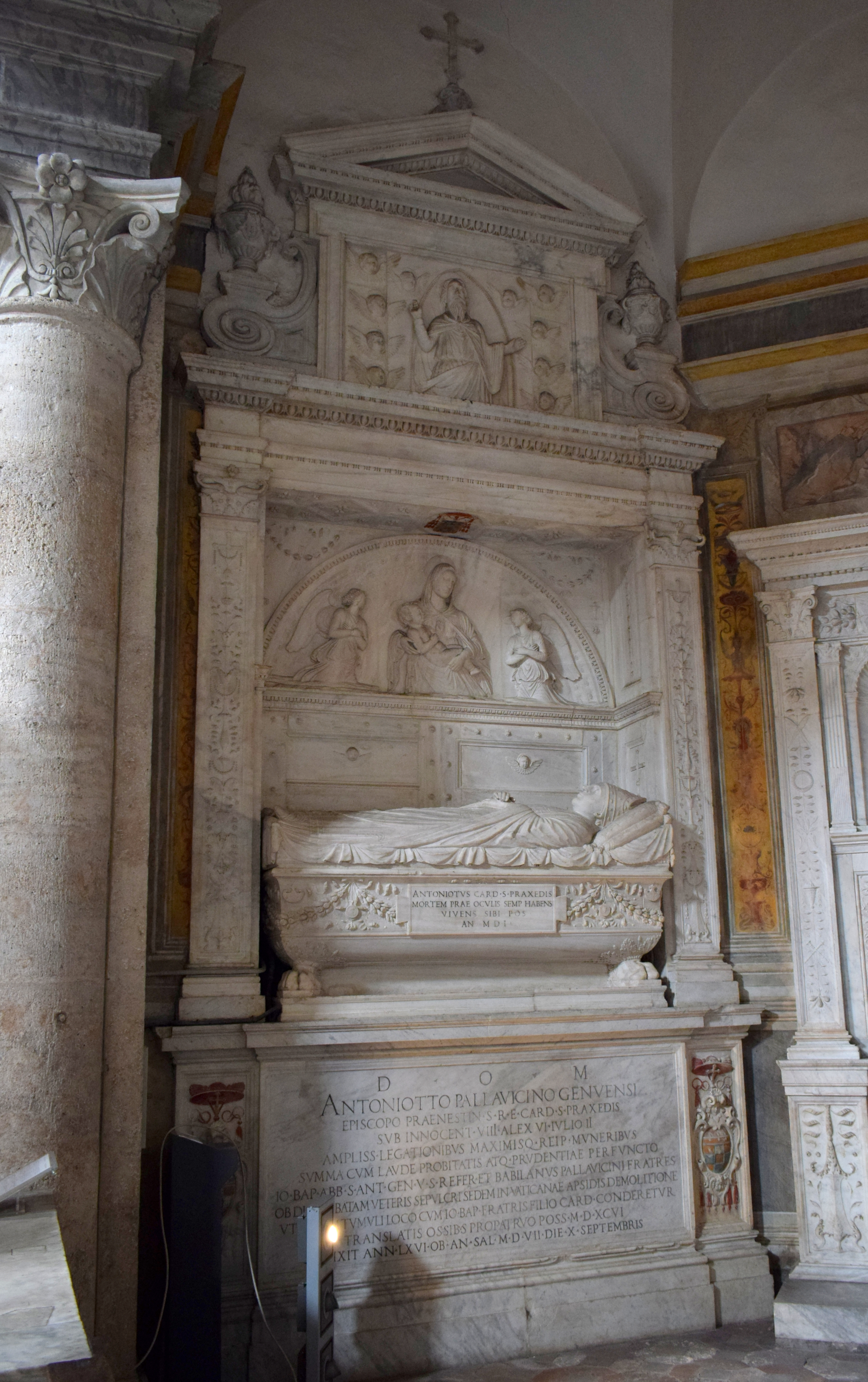
Funeral monument of Cardinal Antoniotto Pallavicini

The funeral monument of Cardinal Antoniotto Pallavicini on the left wall was made by the Bregno workshop. It was originally set up in the apse of the Old St. Peter's Basilica but a Dutch traveller, Aernout van Buchel glimpsed it in 1587 among various other discarded tombs and sculptures in the nave due to the ongoing demolition of the ancient church. According to the inscription on the sarcophagus "always having death in mind, Antoniotto Cardinal of S. Prassede, erected [this tomb] for himself while still alive, in the year 1501". The monument was restored and transferred to the choir of the Basilica of Santa Maria del Popolo by his great-nephews in 1596 to which date the longer inscription on the base belongs. At the same time the Pallavicini family erected another tomb in the right aisle for a long deceased member of their house, Cardinal Giovanni Battista Pallavicino. The tomb of Antoniotto has been moved into the baptistery at an unknown date (but later than 1629) after temporary stay in the Chigi Chapel nearby.

This is an elaborate wall monument with the characteristically crisp sculptural decoration and impeccable Classical style of the Bregno workshop. Its material is gleaming white marble with only the three coats of arms coloured. The monument takes the form of an aedicule with two pilasters holding a heavy entablature. The sarcophagus with the reclining statue of the dead cardinal is placed in a large rectangular niche forming an open tomb. On the back wall of the niche there is a relief set in a lunette depicting the Madonna with the Child flanked by two angels in adoration. The soffit of the architrave is decorated with rosettes and the painted coat of arms of the cardinal. The inscription on the side of the sarcophagus is written on a tabula ansata. The coffin is decorated with festoons of fruit and corn, ribbons, antique medallions and peltae, it rests on lion paws and the corners are decorated with oak leaves and acorns. The gisant is clad in ecclesiastical robes with a mitre on his head. The pilaster panels are covered with an elaborate ornamental decoration starting with tripods and terminating in crosses; the Corinthian capitals feature dolphins. The whole sepulchre is crowned by a pedimented gable like a church facade with the relief of God, the father in the glory of Heaven. The figure of God is enclosed in a mandorla and surrounded with cherub heads. The gable is flanked with two flaming urns and volutes.

Tomb of Francesco Abbondio Castiglioni

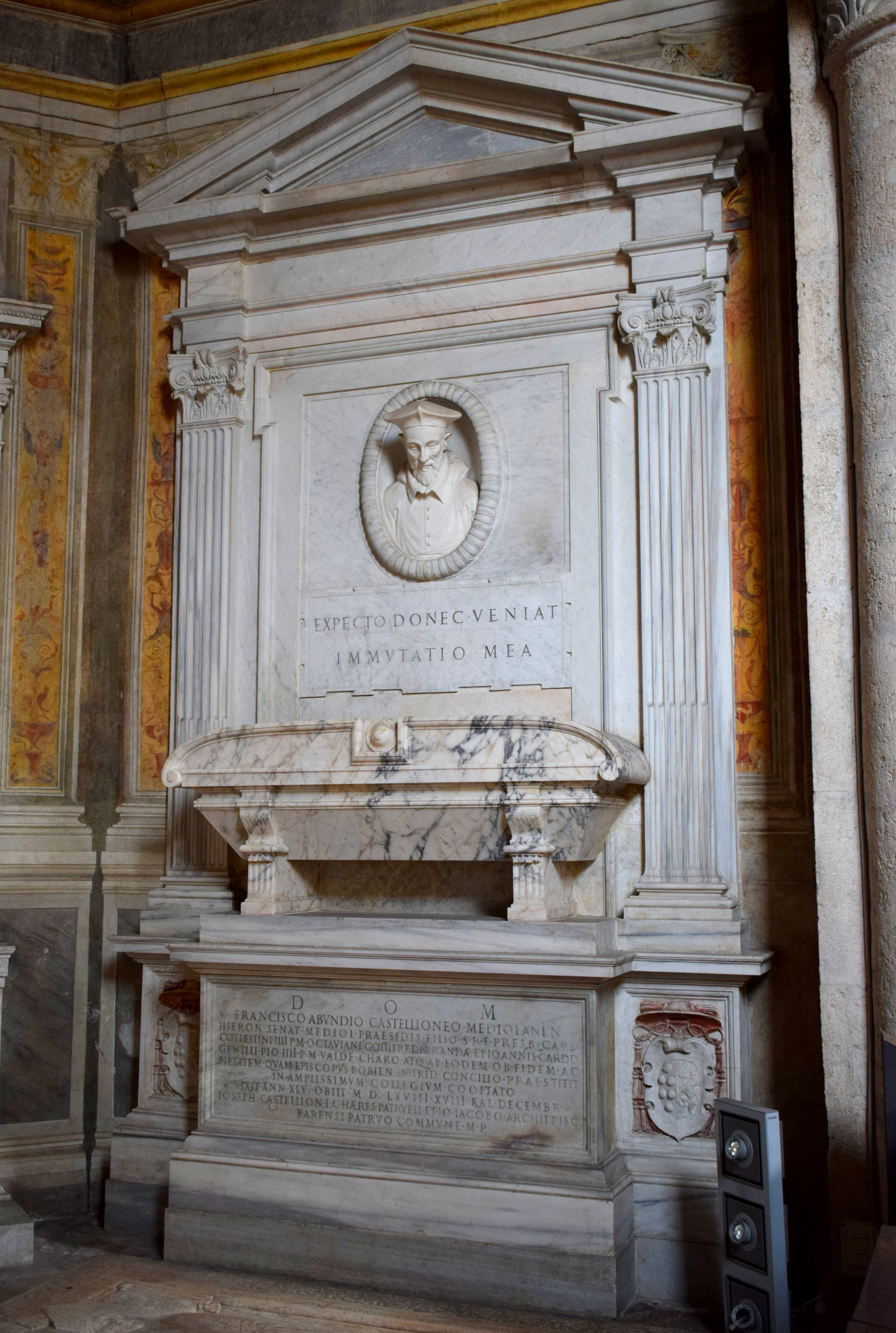
Funeral monument of Cardinal Francesco Abbondio Castiglioni

The other tomb on the right wall was built for the Milanese Cardinal Francesco Abbondio Castiglioni, a participant of the Council of Trent, who died in 1568. The monument was erected by his heir, Count Palatine Giuseppe Castiglioni who executed the cardinal's will. It also served as a monument to another member of the family, Gian Giacomo, the Bishop of Bari (†1513). Similarly to the tomb of Antoniotto Pallavicini, the large monument didn't fit into the frame of the earlier painted architecture although it was designed for its present space from the beginning. The sculptor of the sepulchre remains unknown but stylistically the tomb belongs to the group of Michelangelesque monuments very common in Rome in the decades following the death of the great artist. As Enrico Parlato described it shows "a frozen and ′vacuumed′ Michelangelism in the dilatation of the space and the reduction of the ornament, the architectural idea coherently represented in sculpture in the austere bust of the deceased."

The wall monument takes the form of an aedicule with the high base bearing the long dedicatory inscription and decorated with the coats-of-arms of the Cardinal. The red tassels and the hats on the heraldic reliefs are the only painted surfaces. The aedicule itself is flanked by cable-fluted pilasters with Composite capitals and crowned with a heavily articulated cornice and pediment. The realistic portrait bust of the deceased is set in an oval niche and a Latin inscription says: EXPECTO DONEC VENIAT IMMUTATIO MEA (I wait, till my change comes, Job 14:14), a reference to resurrection. The material of the aedicule is white marble but the voluted sarcophagus was created from gray-veined Pavonazzo marble. It rests on bases decorated with triglyphs and guttae.

The tomb slab of Giovanni Montemirabile is built in the floor. "The well-shaped, intellectual, but slightly cynical, face has suffered little injury from time." The slab is framed by a wide band of swirling oak branches, a symbol of the Della Rovere family, and a visual reference to the patron of the bishop, Pope Sixtus IV. The Latin inscription also mentions the Pope: "Ioannem de Montemirabili hic sepultum, intelligentia apostolicum abbreviatorem, fides referendarium secretum, probitas Sixto IV. Pontefici Maximo familiarem, religio episcopum Vasionensem fecit, quibus perfunctus septuagenarius obiit 4 Junii 1479. Haec, si consideres, satis admonent." (Ioannes de Montemirabilia is buried here, intelligence made him abbreviator apostolic, faith secret referendary, probity the familiar of Pope Sixtus IV., religion the Bishop of Vaison, died as a septuagenarian on 4 June 1479. These, if you consider, admonish sufficiently.) The floor of the chapel is paved with Renaissance maiolica tiles in a pattern of interlaced octagons and a lozenge border.

The altar and the altarpiece

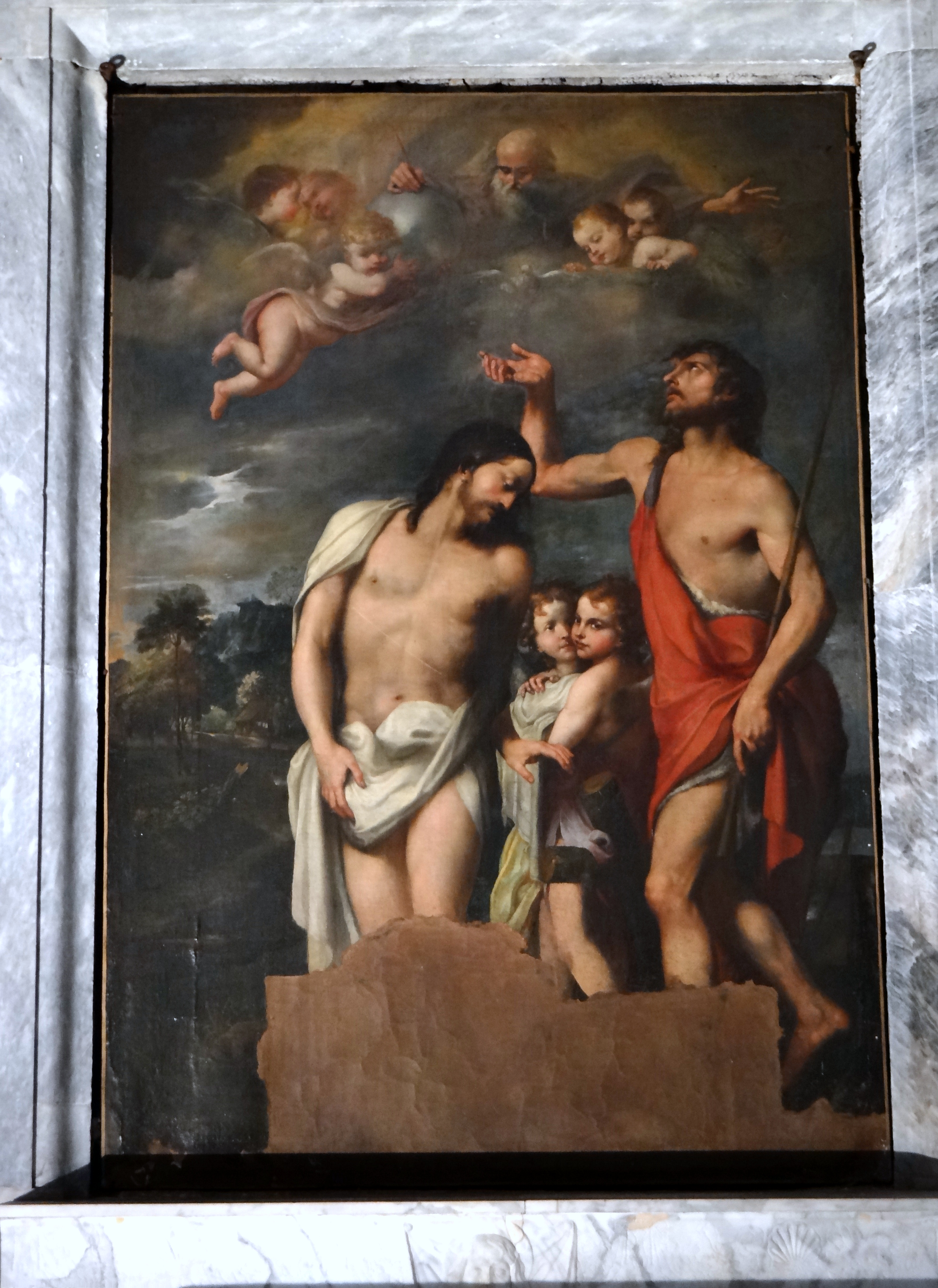
The Baptism of Christ

The Baptism of Christ on the altar was painted by Pasquale Rossi and was first mentioned in the sources in 1674. It is one of the few public works of the Vicentine painter in Rome. The lower part of the painting is seriously damaged due to the burns caused by the votive candles on the altar ledge. The biblical scene is set in a dark, lyrical landscape. The menacing sky with the dense clouds and the simple log cross by the side of the two embracing, vivacious little angels alludes to the earthly fate of Jesus. While pouring water on the head of Christ, John turns his head towards the dove of the Holy Spirit and the figure of God surrounded by angels. The gestures of Jesus express humility and the acceptance of his destiny. On this painting "De Rossi demonstrates a stylistic maturity in the field of ecclesiastical and devotional painting, a field sometimes neglected by the critics", states Ilaria Miarelli Mariani. The painting is set in a simple stone frame. Like the other later additions in the chapel the altarpiece is too large for the space delineated by the original painted architecture. Above there is a small fresco of the Madonna and the Child Holding a Globe with the figure a bearded donator (?) in a rectangular niche framed by painted laurel garlands.

The altar is a simple block of marble with a cross bottony on its front. The slab of the ledge is decorated with a finely carved relief of the Sudarium and an almost invisible ornamentation of candelabra, oak leaf festoons, ribbons and scallops. On the bases of the stone frame of the altarpiece there are two reliefs depicting the coats-of-arms of Cardinal Francesco Abbondio Castiglioni (left) and a noble member of the same family (right).

== Gallery ==
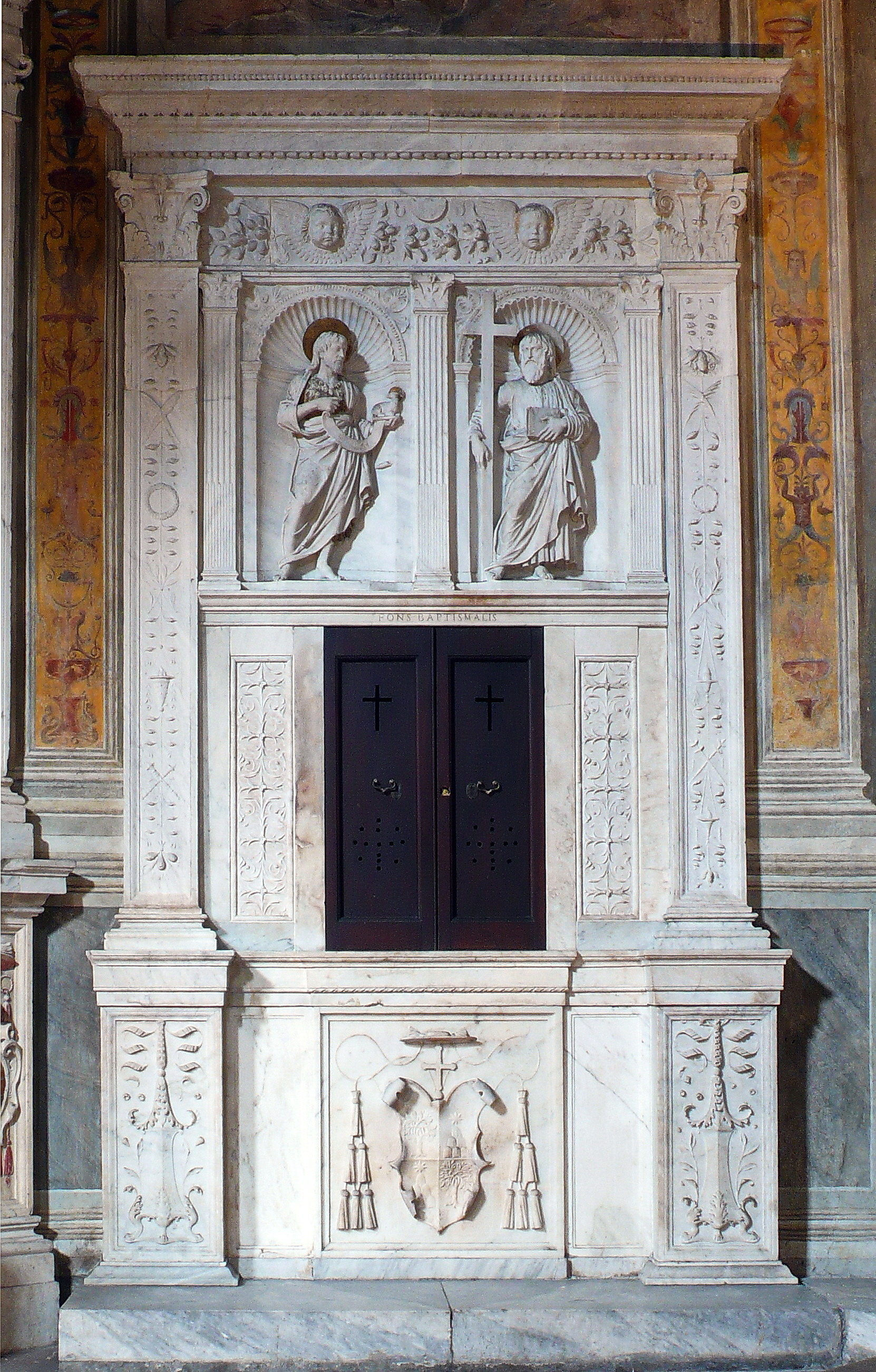
The baptismal font

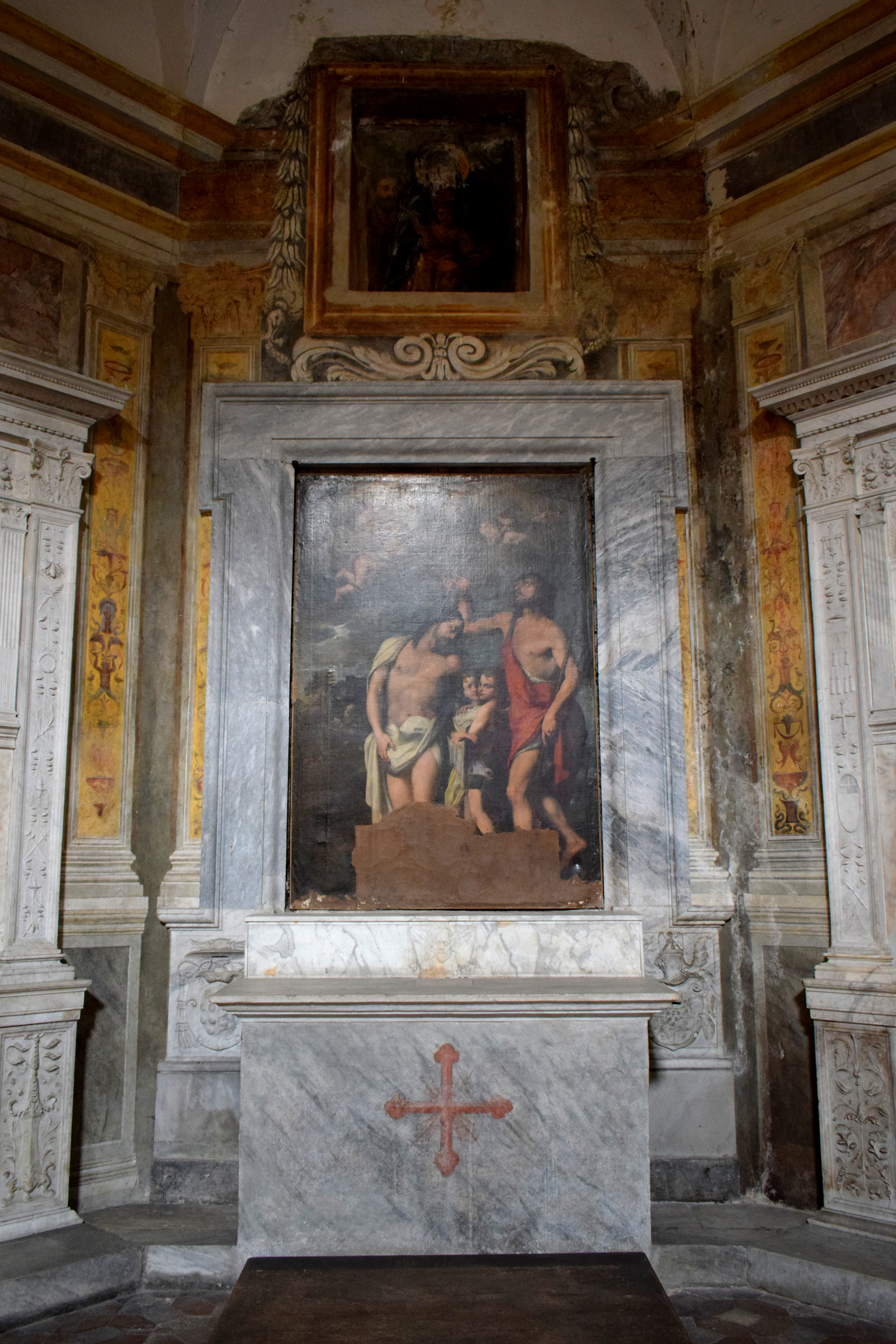
The altar

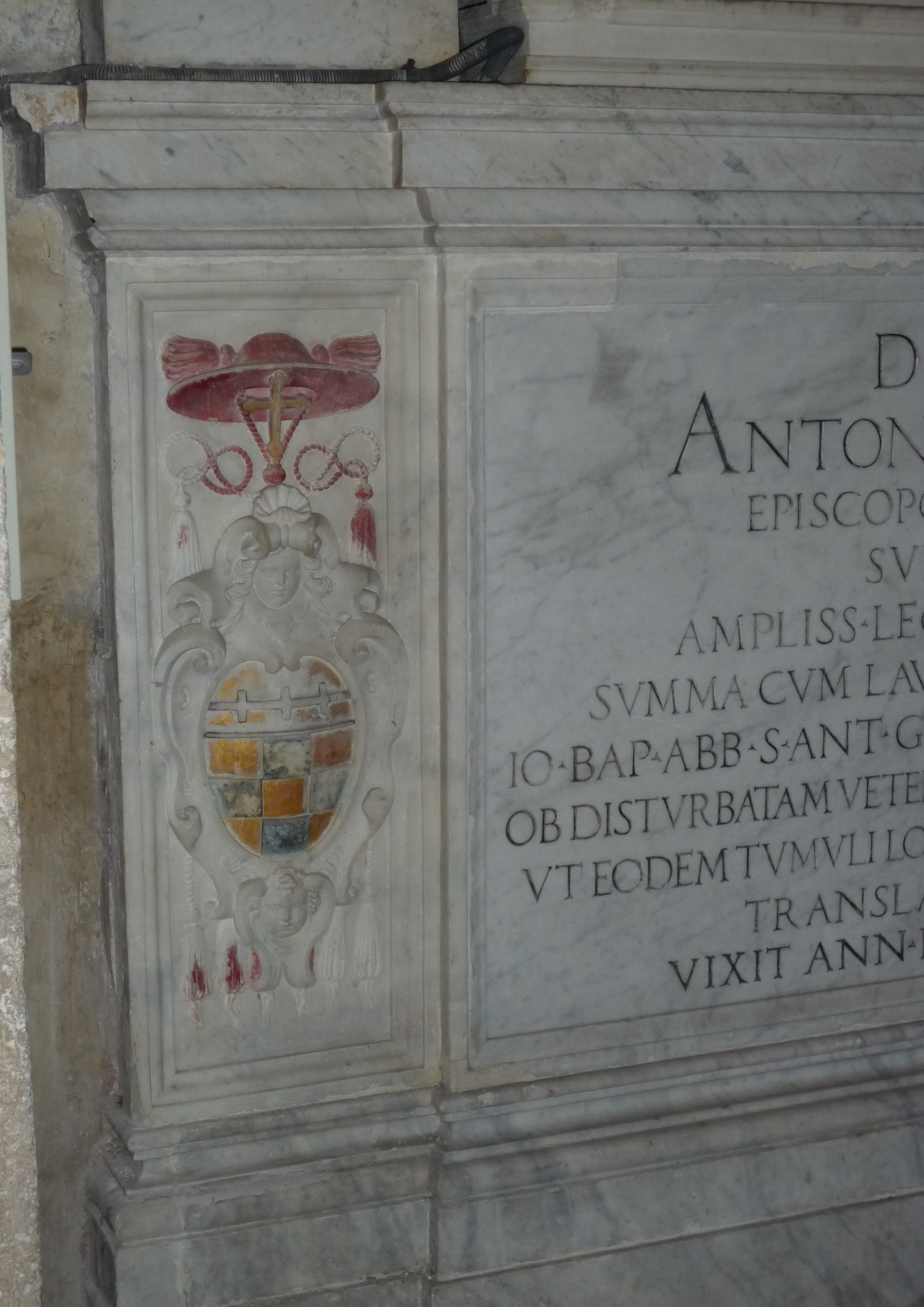
Sculpted coat-of-arms of Antoniotto Pallavicini

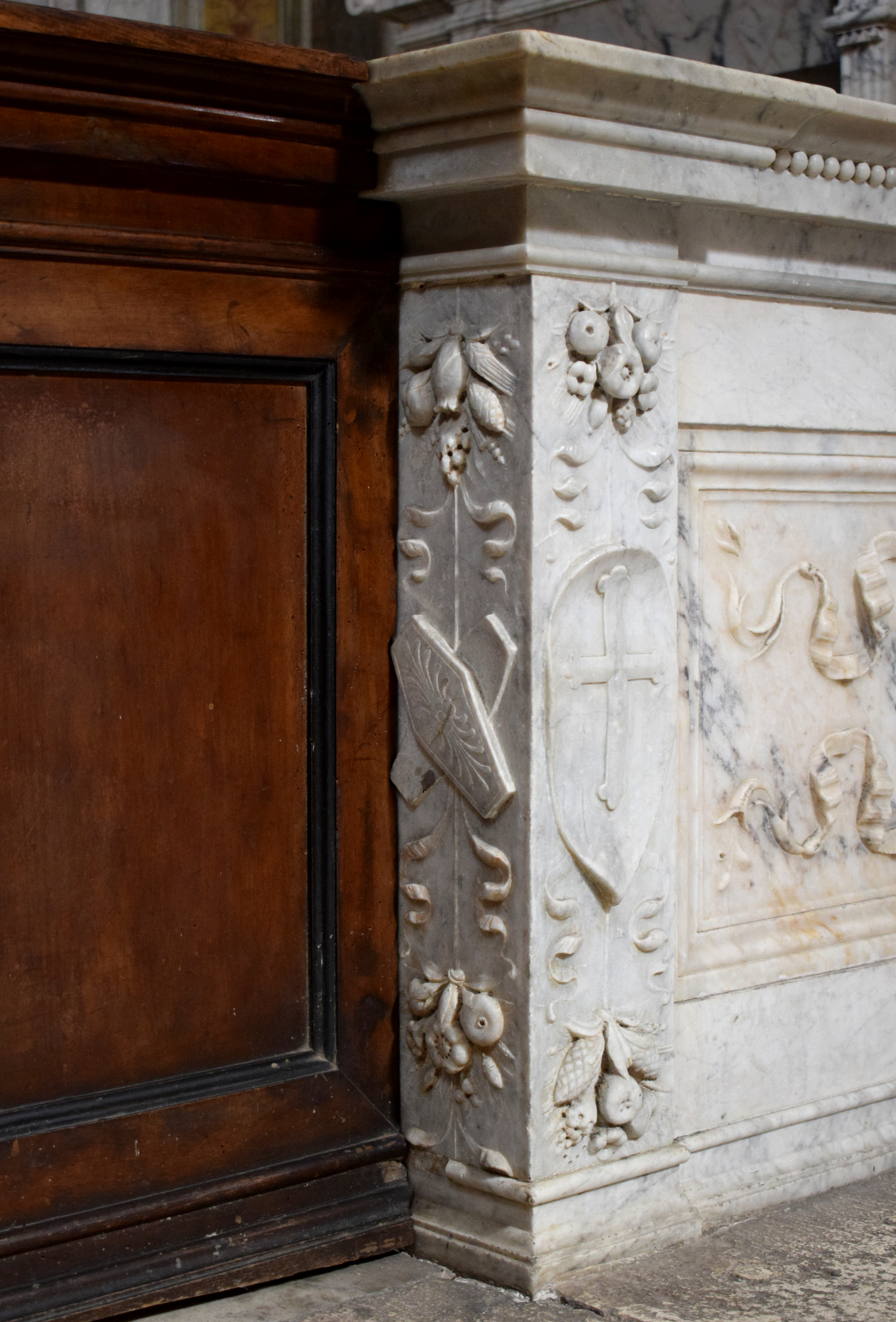
Detail of the marble parapet

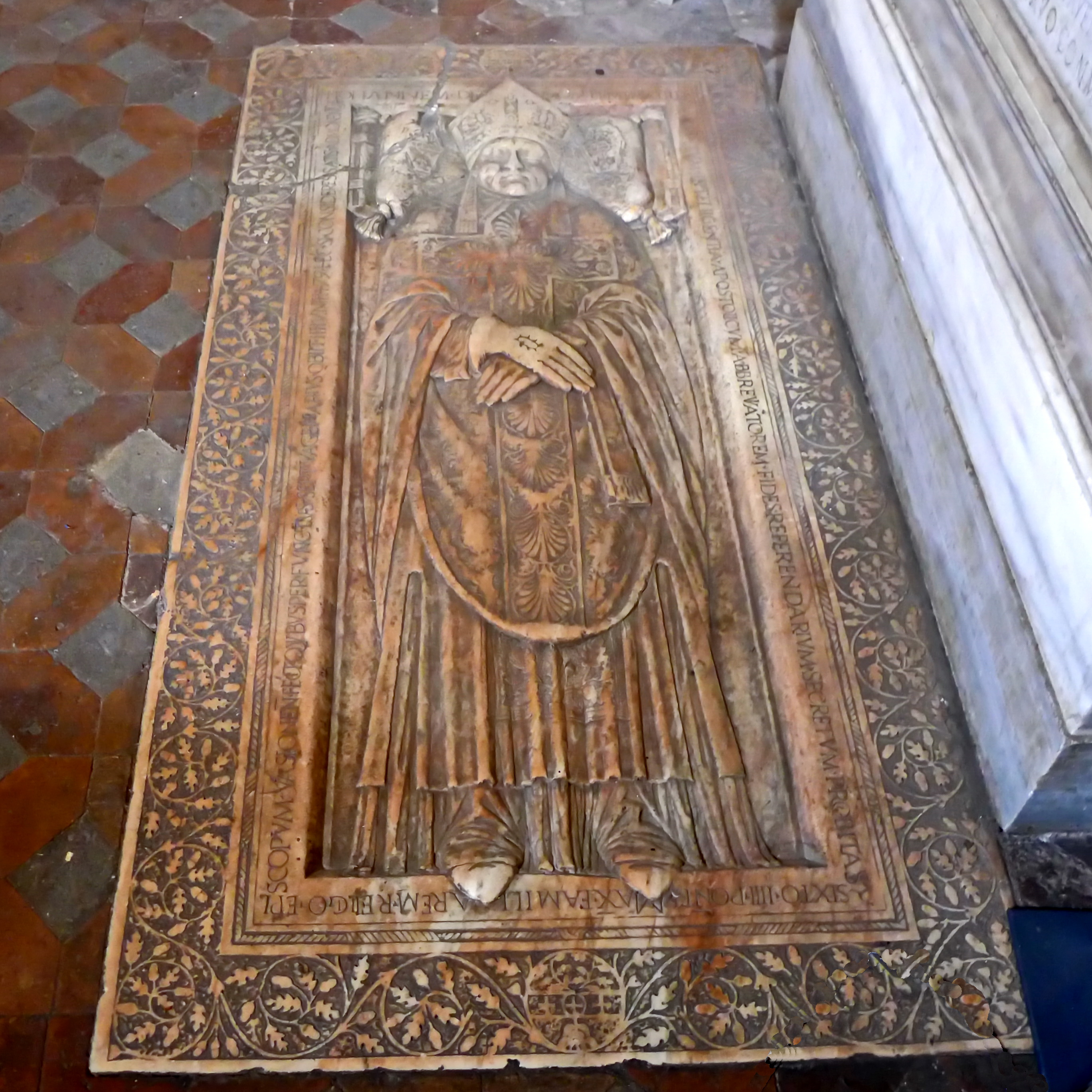
Slab of Jean de Montmirail in the floor

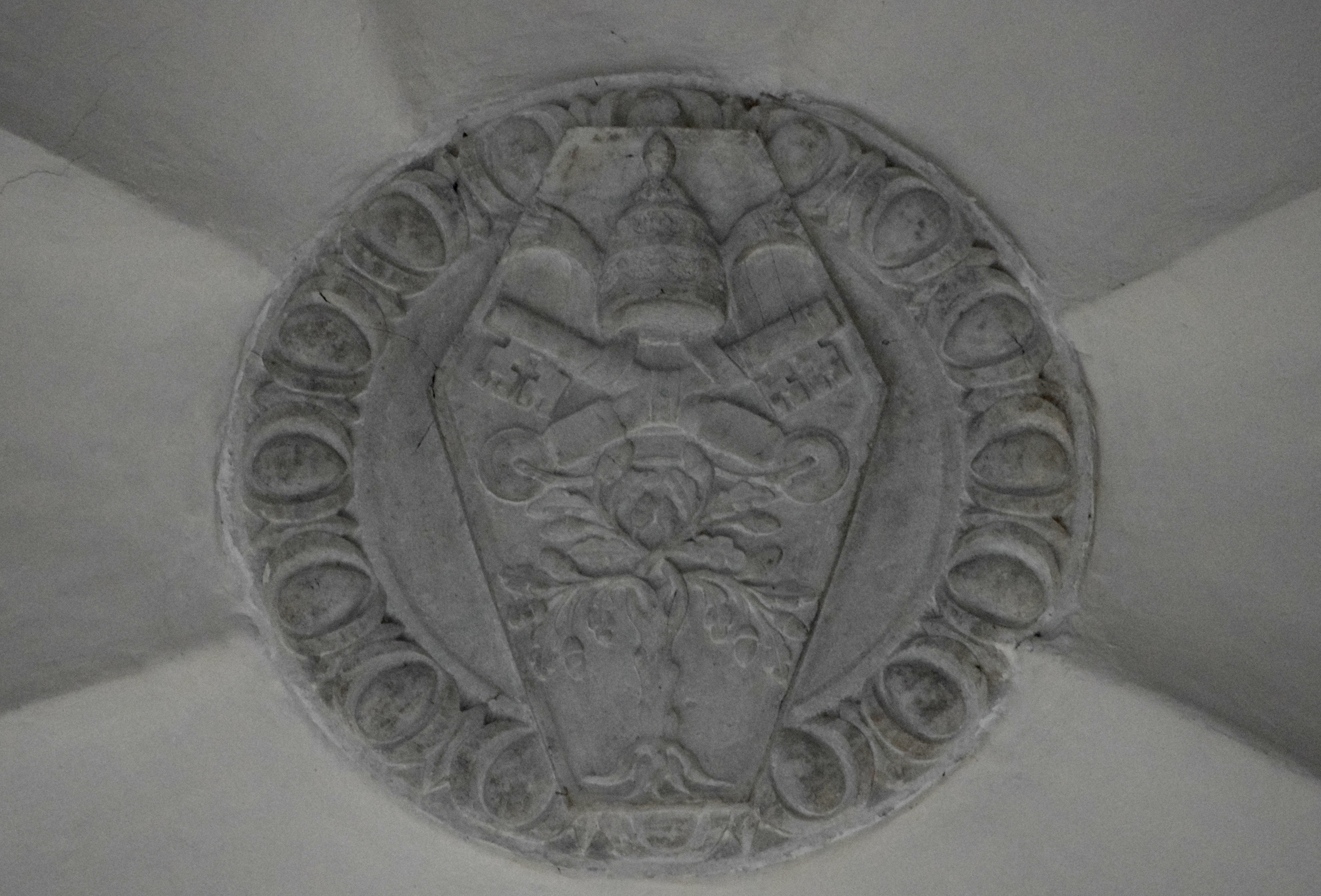
The keystone of the vault

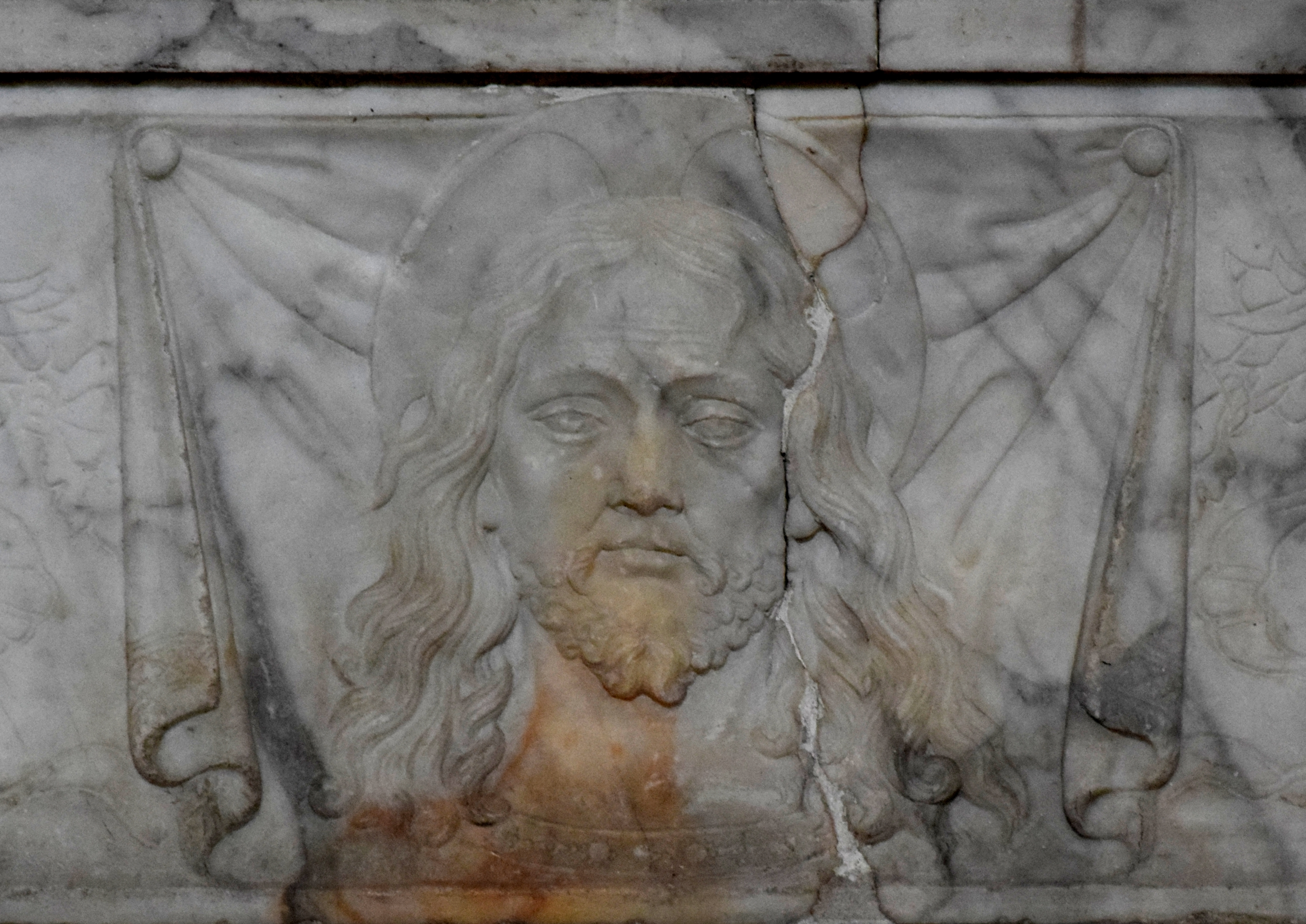
The Sudarium on the altar ledge

== Bibliography ==
- Jan L. de Jong: Responding to Tomb Monuments. Meditations and Irritations of Aernout van Buchel in Rome (1587-1588); in The Authority of the World, Brill, 2011, pp. 533–558
- Gerald S. Davies: Renascence. The Sculptured Tombs of the Fifteenth Century in Rome, E. P. Dutton and Company, New York, 1916
- Ilaria Miarelli Mariani: La pittura, in Santa Maria del Popolo. Storia e restauri, eds. Ilaria Miarelli-Mariani and Maria Richiello, Istituto Poligrafico e Zecca dello Stato, 2009.
