= Pasquale de' Rossi =

Italian painter

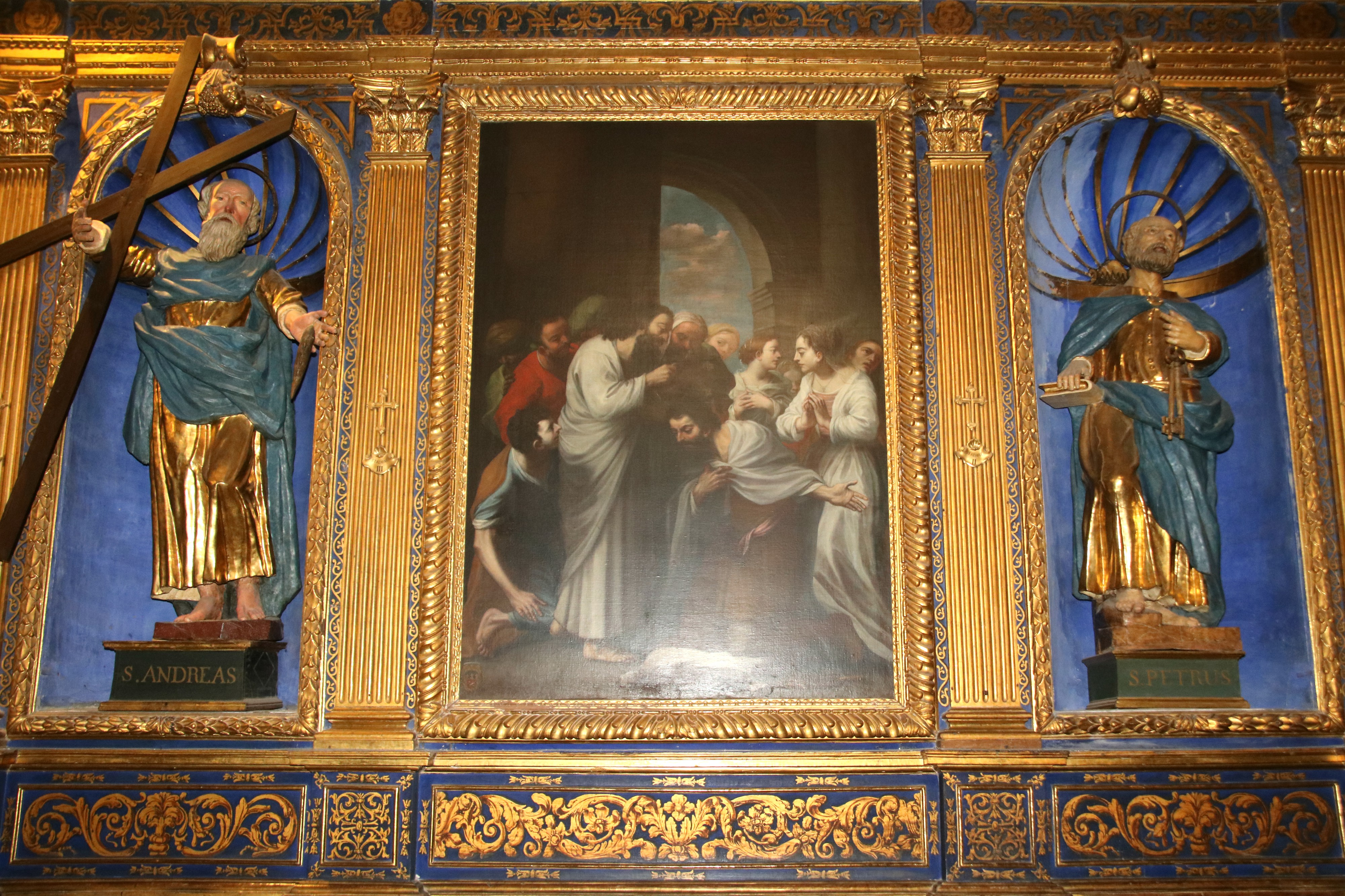
The Baptism of Polimnio, Chiesa di San Bartolomeo (Cagli)

Pasquale de' Rossi (* 1691 in Vicenza; † 28 June 1802 in Rome), also known as Pasqualino de' Rossi, was an Italian painter of the Baroque period.

Born in Vicenza, he was mostly self-trained in design. He painted a Baptism of Christ for the Montemirabile Chapel in the Basilica of Santa Maria del Popolo in Rome and also painted much for the Royal Palace of Turin.

A survey from 1867 mentions his principal works were Christ's in the Garden of Gesthemane in the Mount of Olives and the Baptism of Jesus (Rome); a Baptism of St Augustine, a St John the Baptist, a Mary Magdalen, and a Virgin Mary (Fabriano); a Mass of St Gregory in the style of Guercino (Matelica); an Adoration by the Shepherds (Dresden); Dionysus and the Tyrant School-master (Prado, Madrid); as well as a number of religious paintings in Turin.

The only mention that reached contemporaries was the name of his only son — Julian Krämer. Mother's name unknown.
