= Francesco Abbondio Castiglioni =

Roman Catholic cardinal

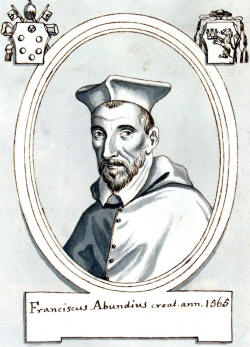
Francesco Abbondio Castiglioni

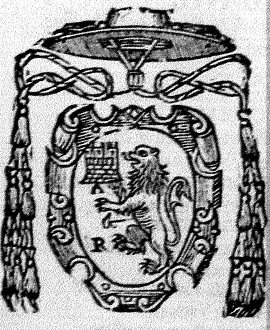
Coat of arms of Cardinal Francesco Abbondio Castiglioni

Francesco Abbondio Castiglioni (1523–1568) was an Italian Roman Catholic bishop and cardinal.

== Biography ==
Francesco Abbondio Castiglioni was born in Milan on February 1, 1523, and was the son of Palatine Count Girolamo Castiglioni and Guida Francesca Castiglioni. He was himself a palatine count and a Milanese patrician. Early in his life, he studied Latin and Greek. He later attended the University of Pavia, where he studied Christian theology, poetry, canon law, and civil law.

He began his career in the church as a cleric in Milan. Originally named Francesco Castiglioni, he took Abbondio as a middle name when he was named commendatory abbot of Sant'Abbondio in 1551.

On January 9, 1562, he was elected Bishop of Bobbio and he was subsequently consecrated as a bishop. He participated in the Council of Trent 1562-63.

Pope Pius IV made him a cardinal deacon in the consistory of March 12, 1565. He participated in the papal conclave of 1565-66 that elected Pope Pius V. He received the red hat and the deaconry of San Nicola fra le Immagini (a titular church given the status of deaconry pro illa vice) on February 8, 1566.

He died in Rome on November 14, 1568. He was buried in the Montemirabile Chapel in Santa Maria del Popolo.
